= New Jersey beacon system =

The New Jersey Beacons or Lord Stirling’s Beacons or the Blue Hills Beacons were a series of beacon fires along the Watchung Mountains created by William Alexander, Lord Stirling under orders from George Washington as an early warning system for the Continental Army to protect against British movements out of New York City.

== Background ==
Following the battles of Long Island and Harlem Heights in August and September of 1776 Commander-in-Chief of North America, William Howe, was able to dislodge the Commander-in-Chief of the Continental Army, George Washington, from New York City and occupy it as his command center while the Continental Congress operated in Philadelphia.

By December George Washington commenced his counter attack, crossing the Delaware River and seeing early success at the battles of Trenton and Princeton before wintering in Morristown. However, after one of the headquarters outlying outposts was routed by the British at the Battle of Bound Brook, Washington relocated to the Middlebrook encampment in Somerset County.

In 1777, after failing to draw Washington out into open battle in New Jersey, Howe launched the Philadelphia campaign, using the Royal Navy to land behind Continental lines and capture their capital at the Battle of Brandywine. With fighting shifting to Pennsylvania Washington moved his winter headquarters to Valley Forge. Howe would resign and be replaced by Henry Clinton, who, after the French entry into the war, abandoned Philadelphia to instead defend New York from a potential French landing attempt.

Washington would shadow Clinton's army during its march from Philadelphia to New York forcing an encounter at the Battle of Monmouth in 1778 which, while being one of the largest battles in the war, was inconclusive as neither side achieved their desired outcome of outright defeating the other, but the Continentals inflicted higher casualties, and retained control of the battlefield. Washington would again camp at Middlebrook for the winter of 1778-1779 but retained his headquarters at Morristown.

== Purpose and locations ==
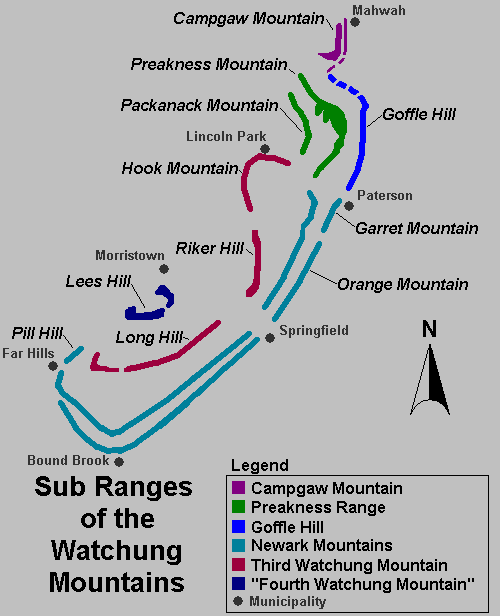
Map of the sub-ranges of the Watchung Mountains where many of the beacons where built.

George Washington sought a more rapid form of communication to inform him of British incursions into New Jersey, viewing the existing system of riders as unreliable and slow. Major General William Alexander, Lord Stirling, began developing the plans for a beacon network in 1779, with Washington writing to sitting Governor William Livingston that the network would allow the army to “communicate the most speedy alarm to the Country.”

Additionally, individual beacon fires would also be used as rallying positions for local Patriot militia companies. The beacons also often included a “signal cannon” that would fire to give an audible alarm as militias “went on the boom" to their rally points. In Monmouth county militia veterans testified that they never saw the beacon fire, but rallied at the sound of the canon instead.

The idea was not novel, with the New Jersey Council of Safety proposing a system of warning beacons as early as January 10, 1776, to warn of a potential British landing at Sandy Hook. A similar beacon network had already been built along the Hudson River from New York to West Point to warn of a British invasion from Canada.

The beacons where built of logs in a pyramidal shape, with a 14-16 square foot base and were about 18-20 feet tall with an interior filled with dried brush. Washington ordered 23 beacons to be constructed:

- #1: on a mountain at the rear of Pluckemin.
- #2: at Steel Gap in the Watchung mountains.
- #3: at Wayne’s Gap in the Watchung mountains.
- #4: at Lincoln’s Gap in the Watchung mountains.
- #5: at Quibbletown Gap in the Watchung mountains (today Washington Rock State Park).
- #6: on a hill near Basking Ridge outside Lord Stirling's estate.
- #7: on a hill "towards Princeton".
- #8: in front of Martin’s Tavern in Short Hills (present day Millburn).
- #9: on a mountain just north of Springfield.
- #10: on the summit of a hill one mile southeast of Chatham bridge (present day Summit).
- #11: next to a windmill in Long Hill.
- #12: on the summit of Kenny's Hill in Morristown (Fort Nonsense).
- #13: on the summit of Pidgeon Hill near Morristown (present day Parsippany).
- #14: on the summit of Schuyler's Mountain near Pluckemin.
- #15: on a hill ten miles west of Pluckemin.
- #16: at the southern point of Cushetunk Mountain.
- #17: on a hill near Flemington.
- #18: on the summit of "Southern Hill" (possibly Goat Hill in modern day West Amwell Township).
- #19: at the heights of Amwell.
- #20: near Princeton.
- #21: on the summit of Carter Hill in Monmouth County.
- #22: on the summit of Middletown Hill in Monmouth county.
- #23: on the summit of Mount Pleasant in Monmouth county.

It took 24 men one day to build each beacon. #1 was built by men under the command of Henry Knox, #2 and #6 by those under William Woodford and Charles Scott, #3, #4, and #5 by those under William Smallwood, #7 by those under Arthur St. Clair, #8 by those under Peter Muhlenberg while the rest where built by either local militias or citizenry. A company of armed sentinels under the command of either a captain or lieutenant would be stationed at each beacon with a log cabin or two constructed for their quarters at each site.

Several other beacons where proposed but not constructed, such as a beacon in the Navesink Highlands that was not built on the recommendation of Joseph Holmes arguing that it would be impossible to defend. Also, there is no evidence that the beacon at Ft. Nonsense would be built. Additionally, several beacons where talked about in memoirs, letters, and orders but where not in the initial list of 23 approved by Washington, these include beacons at Kettle Hill in Connecticut Farms, McGee's Hill in Elizabeth, Mount Bethel near Warren, Gouverneur Mountain near Ringwood, Bottle Hill in present day Madison, Federal Hill in Pompton, Beacon Hill near Parsippany, Denville, and Green Pond Mountain.

== Use ==
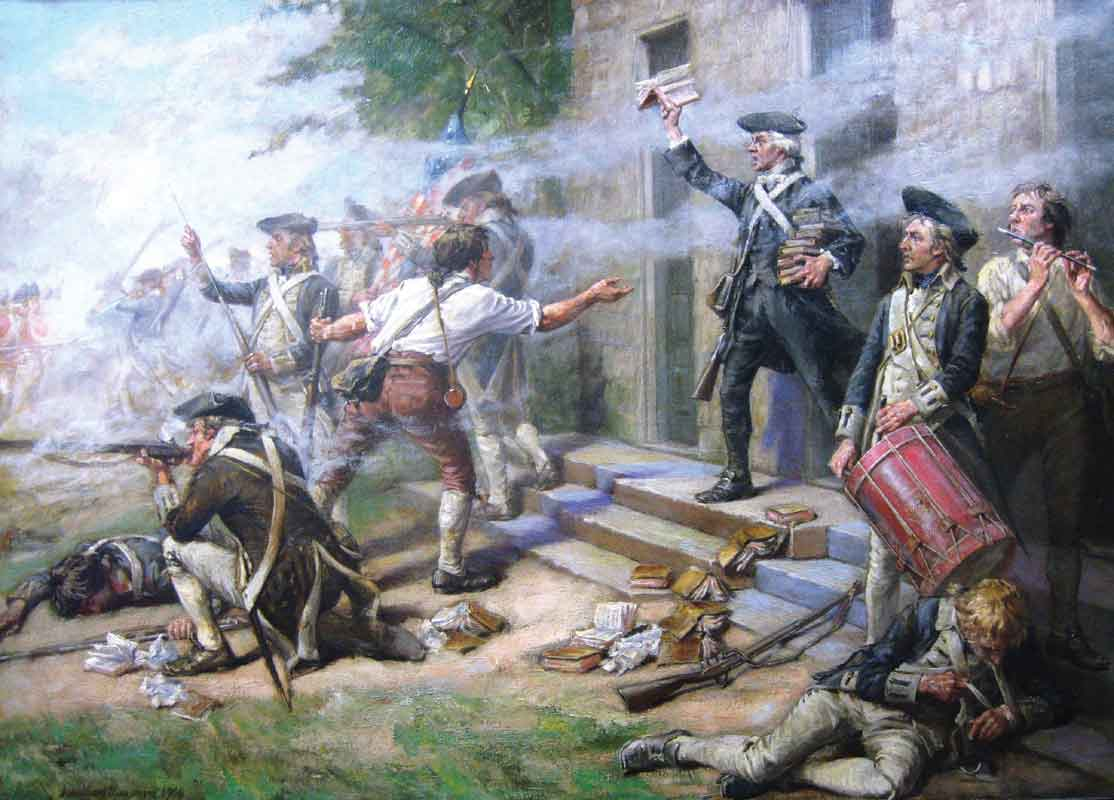
The beacon network gave local militias enough time to rally for the Battle of Springfield.

The beacons at the crest of the Short Hills (#8-12) allowed a view of the whole of New York Bay, Staten Island, Newark Bay, Newark, Elizabethtown, and Springfield on a clear day.

In June 1780 the British performed a large landing at Elizabethtown Point under Wilhelm von Knyphausen and began to march towards the Hobart Gap to reach Morristown under the belief Washington's forces were severely depleted from desertions, with the beacons along the Watchung Mountains being lit for the first time on June 7. This early warning gave Washington time to muster the Continental army to meet them but not before Knyphausen grew disillusioned with the resistance of the New Jersey citizenry and Sacked Connecticut Farms before withdrawing.

The beacons would be lit for their second and final time when Knyphausen again ferried his troops across the Hudson on June 23. This time his 6,000 strong force was met by 1,500 Americans at the Springfield side of the Rahway River. The Americans prevailed in the ensuing Battle of Springfield forcing Knyphausen to again withdraw. These battles marked the last significant fighting in the northern states during the Revolution.

== Legacy ==
In the 1880s and 1890s wealthy individuals from New York would begin moving to New Jersey in large numbers, establishing an extensive network of suburbs during what was called Boroughitis. During this, many formerly sparsely inhabited regions of Northern New Jersey suddenly became entire towns with their respective beacons being one their few sites of note especially along the ridge of the Short Hills. Some of these suburbs built an identity around these beacons with the strongest example being Summit whose old city seal is beacon #10 with its "Old Sow" signal canon, while its present seal and flag consists of a beacon flame. Parsippany also commemorates their "Beacon Hill" and built a hiking trail up to its summit. Beacon #11 also has a memorial plaque in Stirling. Denville, while its beacon wasn't on Washington's initial list, maintains a preserved replica of their beacon, also located on a hill named Beacon Hill. Washington Rock State Park also marks the location of two of the beacons, #4 and #5 with a trail running between them.

== See also ==
- New Jersey in the American Revolution
- Byzantine beacon system
