= Equestrian statue of George Washington (Morristown, New Jersey) =

1928 statue by Frederick Roth

George Washington
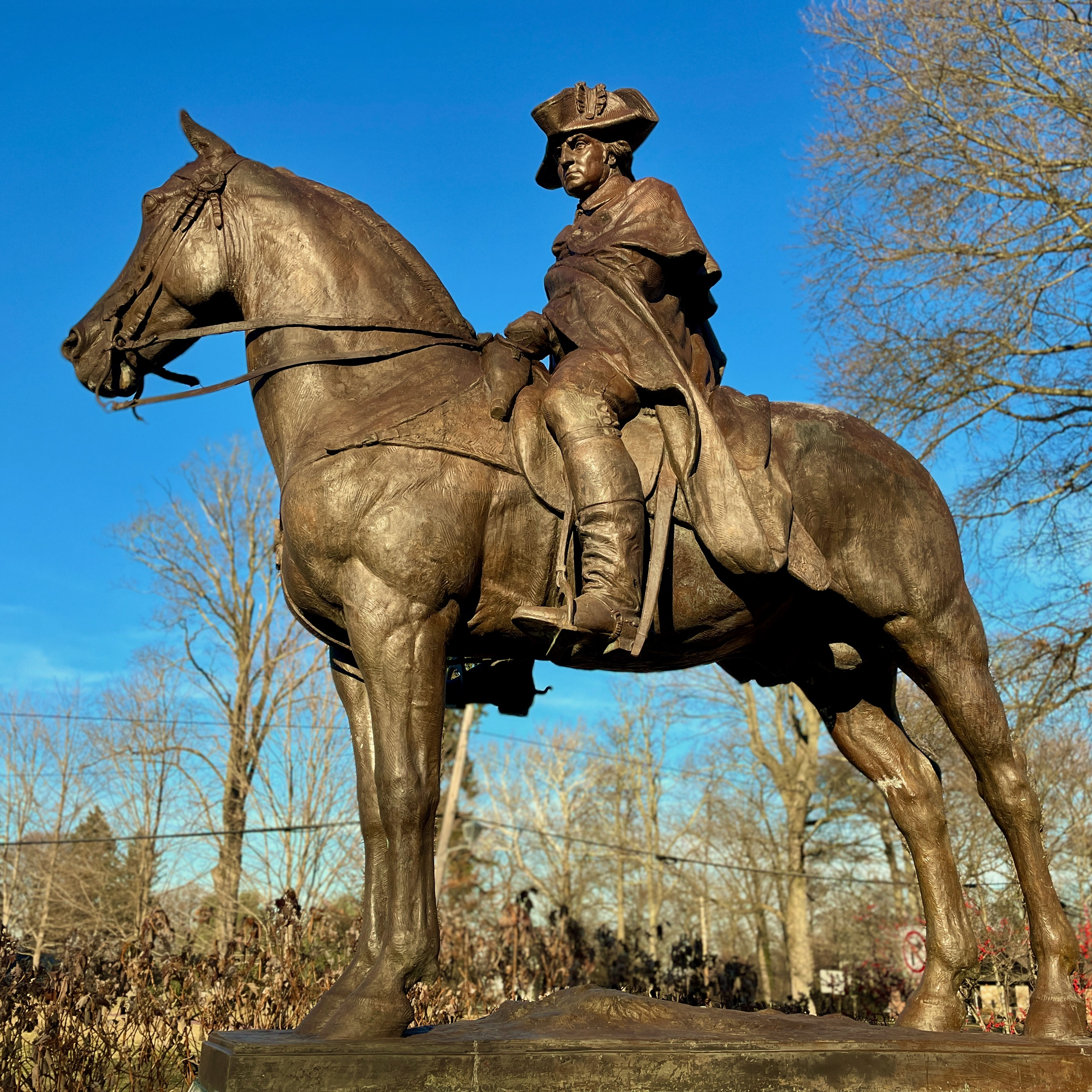
- George Washington by Frederick Roth

- Artist: Frederick Roth
- Year: c. 1927, dedicated October 19, 1928
- Medium: Bronze sculpture
- Subject: George Washington
- Dimensions: 3.7 m × 1.4 m × 3.0 m (12 ft × 4.6 ft × 10 ft)
- Location: Morristown, New Jersey, United States; 40°47′44.6″N 74°27′59″W

George Washington is an outdoor equestrian statue by the American sculptor Frederick Roth located near the Ford Mansion, Washington's Headquarters, in Morristown, New Jersey, United States. It was commissioned by philanthropist E. Mabel Clark to commemorate General George Washington's importance to the history of the city. The bronze sculpture was dedicated on October 19, 1928, the anniversary of the surrender of British General Charles Cornwallis at Yorktown in 1781.

== History ==
Morristown was the site of two winter encampments by the Continental Army during the American Revolutionary War. The first one was from January to May 1777, with Washington's headquarters at Arnold's Tavern. The second one was from December 1779 to June 1780, with Washington's headquarters at the Ford Mansion.

E. Mabel Clark was the daughter of Charles F. Clark, President of the Bradstreet Company, now Dun & Bradstreet. The family lived in New York City and had a country house, Fairacres, in the Normandy Park section of Morristown. She commissioned Frederick Roth for an equestrian statue of Washington and specified that the horse be modeled after the workhorse she had seen pulling a milk wagon in New York. Roth was known as an animal sculptor, especially for his 1925 Statue of Balto in New York's Central Park. He finished c. 1927 and had the statue cast in Florence, Italy, at the bronze works foundry of Gusmano Vignali c. 1927–1928. The installation site, a small triangular plot bounded by Morris and Washington Avenues, was donated to the city by Dr. Henry M. Dodge. Clark donated the statue to the city at the dedication on October 19, 1928. Speakers included Mayor Clyde W. Potts and Justice Charles W. Parker of the New Jersey Supreme Court. The sculptor attended the ceremony and was honored at a reception hosted by Clark.

== Description ==
The sculpture depicts Washington in winter, wearing a uniform with a mantle and tricorner hat. The sculptor signed it: F.G.R. Roth. The statue measures approximately 12 feet (3.7 m) high x 4 feet 7 inches (1.40 m) wide x 10 feet (3.0 m) long and is on a granite base that measures approximately 5 feet (1.5 m) high x 5 feet 10 inches (1.78 m) wide x 11 feet (3.4 m) long. The front of the base is inscribed: Washington, the back is inscribed:

Headquarters at Morristown
January – May 1777
December 1779 – June 1780

== Legacy ==
A photograph of the statue, with Washington's Headquarters in the background, was featured in the booklet for the dedication of the Morristown National Historical Park on July 4, 1933. Clark was a member of the reception committee. The statue was surveyed by the Save Outdoor Sculpture program of the Smithsonian American Art Museum in 1994.

== Gallery ==
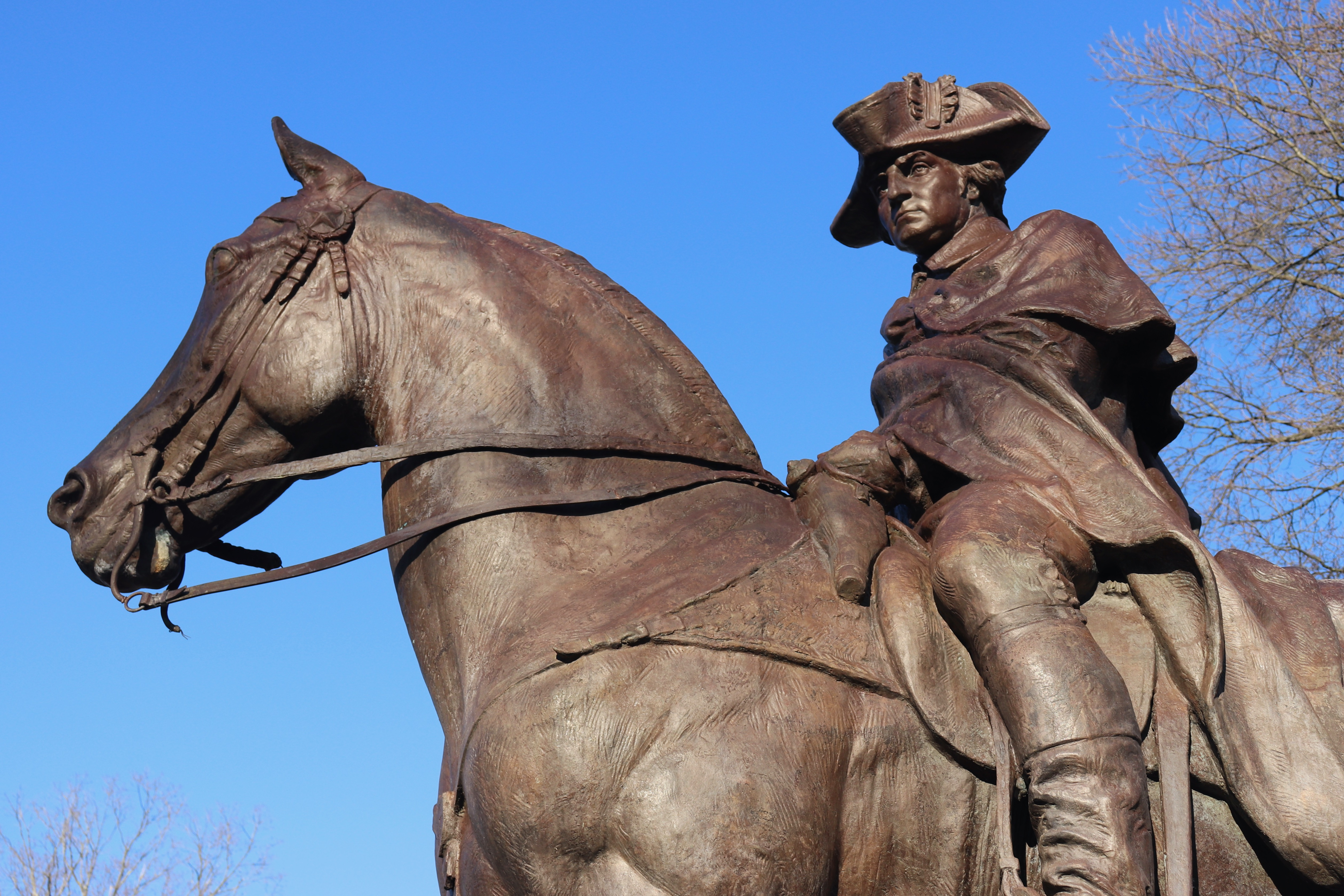
Detailed view of Washington and his horse

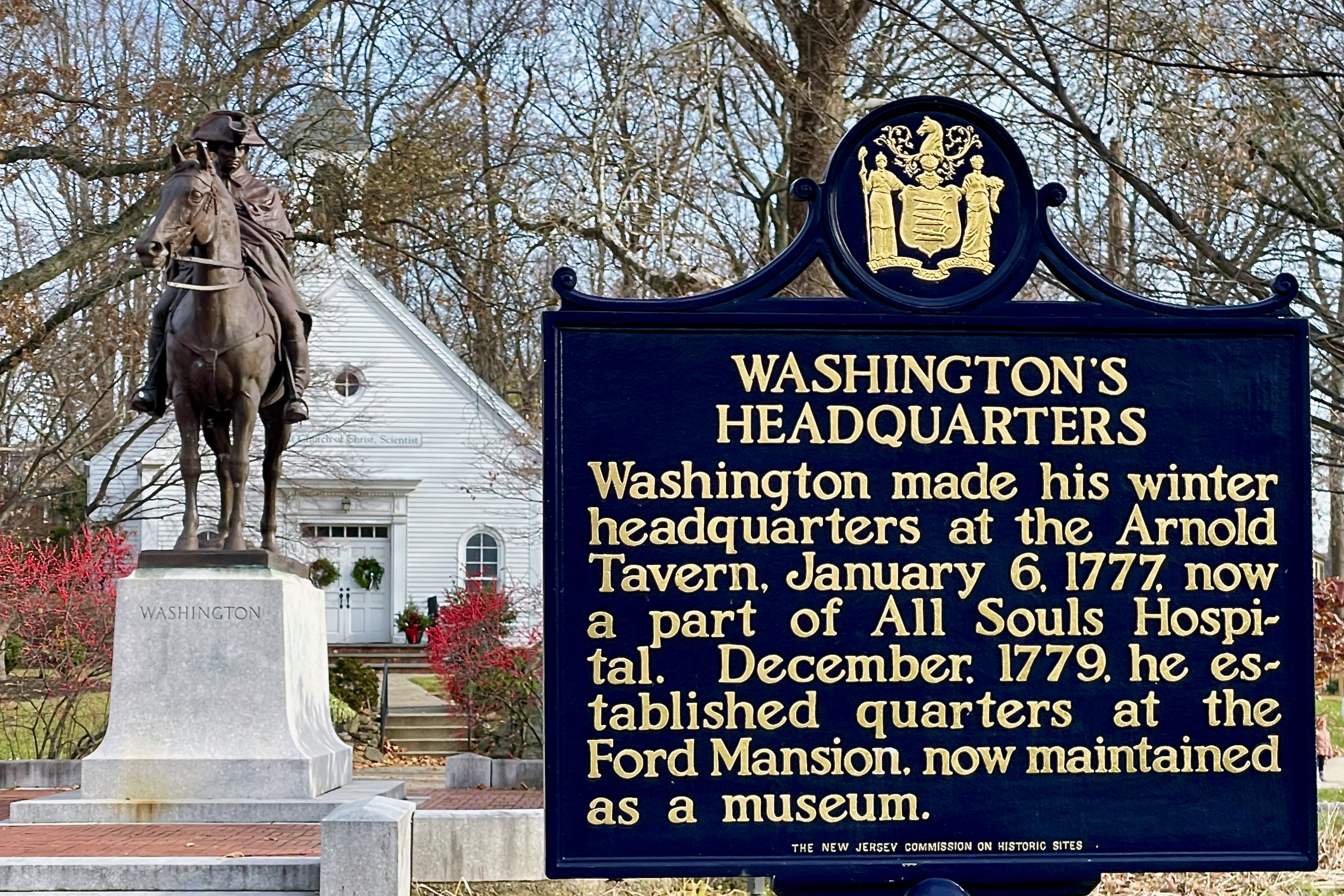
Washington's Headquarters information sign by the statue

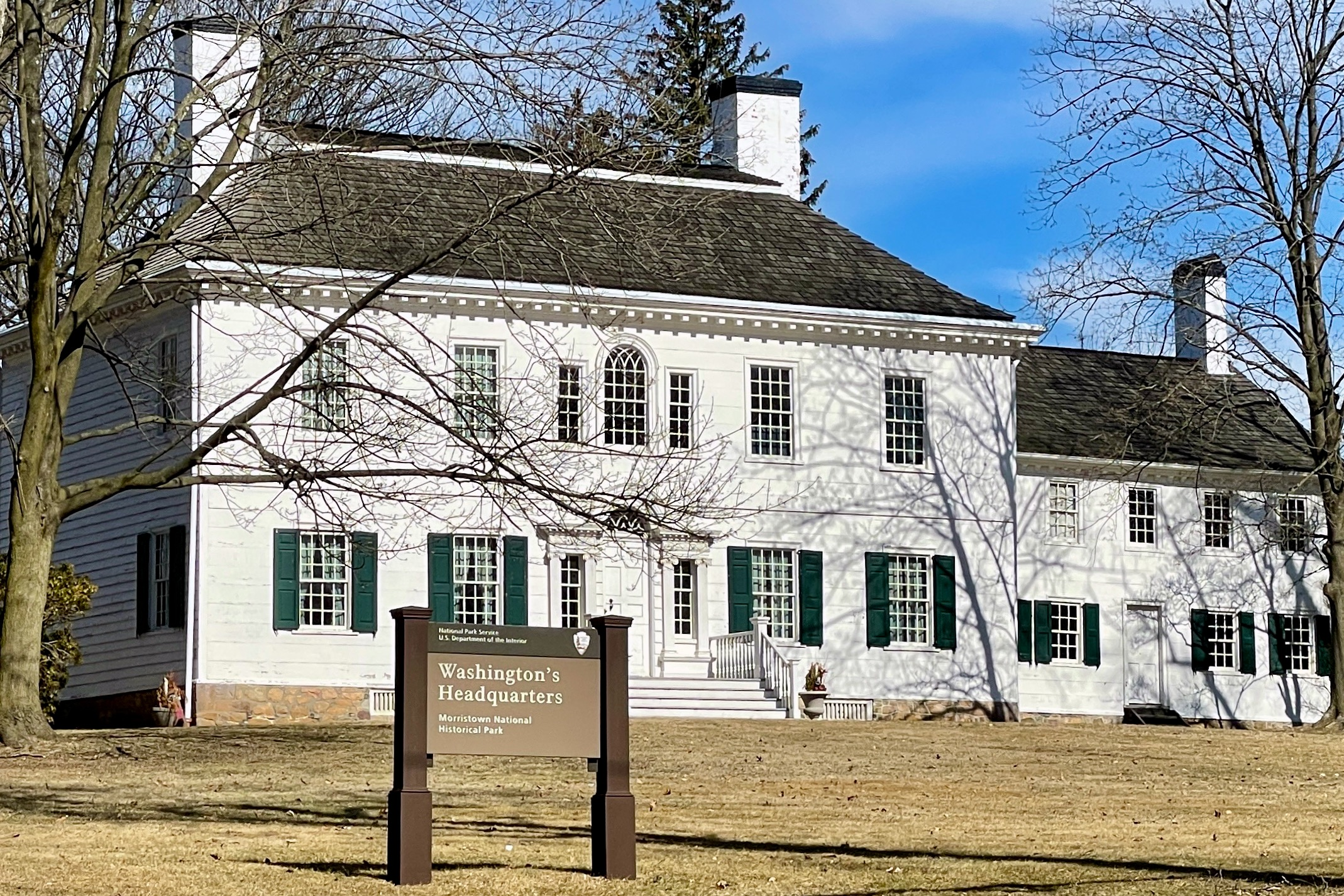
The Ford Mansion, Washington's Headquarters, across the street from the statue

== See also ==
- List of Washington's Headquarters during the Revolutionary War
- List of statues of George Washington
- List of sculptures of presidents of the United States
- List of equestrian statues in the United States
- New Jersey in the American Revolution
