= Fort Nonsense (Morristown, New Jersey) =

- U.S. Historic district – Contributing property
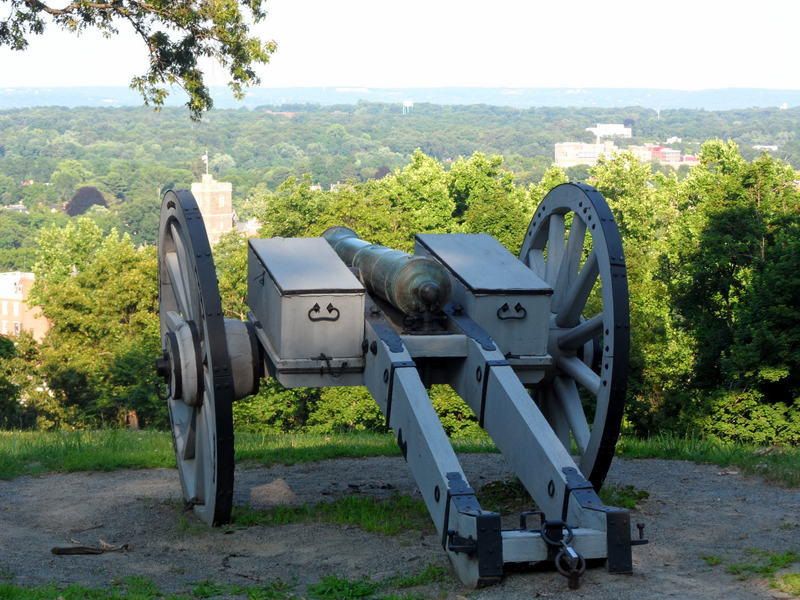
- Cannon at Fort Nonsense

- Location within Morris County, New Jersey
- Coordinates: 40°47′37″N 74°29′18″W
- Part of: Morristown National Historical Park (ID66000053)
- Added to NRHP: October 15, 1966

Fort Nonsense is one of four sites comprising the Morristown National Historical Park, in Morristown, Morris County, New Jersey, United States. Two other sites in Morris County are the Ford Mansion and Jockey Hollow. The fourth is the New Jersey Brigade Encampment Site in Bernardsville, Somerset County.

Fort Nonsense occupies a high hilltop overlooking Morristown, and is believed to have been the site of a signal fire or smoke signal, along with earthworks. It was originally built at the order of General George Washington in 1777 for use during the American Revolutionary War that began in 1775 and was ended in 1783 by the Treaty of Paris.

== History ==
The derivation of the name "Fort Nonsense" is unknown. Researchers say it does not appear in any known document before 1833. The often cited story is that Washington's original purpose for constructing the fort was to keep the American troops busy and out of trouble; however, Washington's intention is reportedly disclosed by an order in 1777, issued as he moved the Continental Army to the Middlebrook encampment.

The National Park Service provides these details:

It was common for a small fortification to be built for the protection of military encampments and strategic military depots. Originally referred to as "the Hill" or "Kinney’s Hill," it commanded the town. Washington’s men dug trenches, raised embankments, built a guardhouse for 30 men, and fortified the crown of the hill with an earthwork redoubt or breastwork. The main function of the Fort was as a place of retreat for guards stationed in the town.

The location of Fort Nonsense is at the highest point rising above a relatively level plateau west of the Watchung Mountains on which Morristown was settled. The strategic point provides a clear view of the lands to the north, east, and south with a range of mountains arising directly to the west of the point.

The mountains of northern New Jersey provided safe retreats behind natural barriers that the British troops and their conscripted Hessian auxiliaries to Great Britain were never ordered to scale after they had fared badly while attempting to negotiate the few passes, such as Hobart Gap. The movements of the British and their troops between New York and Philadelphia skirted along the coastal and narrow piedmont regions of the state until passing the southern boundary of the mountain ranges, readily visible to the scouts stationed atop the mountains to monitor their movement. George Washington ordered a signal beacon to be built at the fort as part of a wider network but it is unclear if it was ever built.

== Current status ==
As it is not a current strategic outlook post but is rather a public park, much of the forest has grown back. The park service maintains open space on the east facade and the very top where a parking lot and a small park with a period cannon are located. The eastward view encompasses the entire New York City skyline, Morristown's busy South Street, and most towns in between Morristown and New York City.
