= Crossroads of the American Revolution National Heritage Area =

United States National Heritage Area in New Jersey

The Crossroads of the American Revolution National Heritage Area (XRDS) is a federally designated National Heritage Area encompassing portions of 14 counties in New Jersey that were the scene of significant actions in the American Revolutionary War in late 1776 through 1778. The designated area covers the Delaware and Hudson valleys in New Jersey and the central portion of the state between the valleys where the Continental Army fought forces under British command. The National Heritage Area includes Morristown National Historical Park and sites associated with the Battle of Monmouth as well as Princeton, New Jersey, the meeting place of the Continental Congress when peace was declared in 1783.

At the direction of Congress, the National Park Service studied the national importance of the Revolutionary War resources in New Jersey. In 2002 the United States Secretary of the Interior told Congress that New Jersey met all the requirements for becoming a National Heritage Area. President George W. Bush signed the legislation making XRDS an official heritage area in 2006.

The territory covered by XRDS includes the following counties from north to south: Passaic, Bergen, Morris, Essex, Hudson, Union, Hunterdon, Somerset, Middlesex, Mercer, Monmouth, Burlington, Camden and Gloucester.

Crossroads of the American Revolution Association is a not-for-profit organization created in 2002 in order to increase awareness of the American Revolution in New Jersey. The organization promotes open space, historical preservation and an enhancement of economic development in New Jersey. The Association was designated by the National Park Service as the management entity responsible for the National Heritage Area.

== See also ==
- New Jersey in the American Revolution
