= Laura Witte =

American suffragette

- Born: Laura Elisabeth Theodore Roth; April 16, 1869; Brooklyn, New York
- Died: November 15, 1939 (aged 70); Rostock, Germany
- Other names: German suffragette and women's rights advocate
- Spouse: Friedrich Carl Witte (1864–1938)
- Parent(s): Johannes Roth (1837-1894) and Jane (Bean) Roth (1841-1901)

Laura Witte (April 16, 1869 — November 15, 1939) was an American who became a women’s rights activist and suffragette in Germany during the early 20th century.

== Formative years ==
Born on April 16, 1869, in Brooklyn, New York, Laura Elisabeth Theodore Roth was the eldest daughter of Johannes Roth (1837–1894), a cotton merchant, and his wife, Jane (Bean) Roth (1841–1901). She was the sister of sculptor Frederick Roth (1872–1944) and the aunt of politician Annemarie von Harlem (1894–1983).

In pursuit of better education, Laura traveled to Germany to the community of Bremen, where her family had a home, and to Rostock, where her uncle Friedrich Roth resided. While in Germany, she met Friedrich Carl Witte (1864–1938), a German chemist, whom she married on June 7, 1892, and together, they had five children: Johanna (born c. 1893), Friedrich (born c. 1895), Siegfried (1897–1961), Elisabeth (born c. 1903), and Carl August (born c. 1908).

After 1908, Witte became a volunteer in early childhood education centers and also began lecturing actively about the need to create equal rights for women while campaigning on behalf of the Mecklenburg State Association for Women's Suffrage.

By 1915, she served on multiple boards of directors, including the Association for Social Aid Work.

After becoming a member of the German Democratic Party, Witte was appointed chair of the party's women's group in 1919. That same year, she addressed the chapter of the German Democratic Party located in Bad Doberan. Speaking about "Woman in the new Germany,” she reflected on the status of women who had been granted the right to vote in 1918, and advocated equal pay for women.

== Death ==
Laura Witte died in Rostock, Germany, on November 15, 1939.
