= New Jersey in the American Revolution =

New Jersey played a central role in the American Revolution both politically and militarily. It was the site of more than 90 military engagements, including the pivotal battles of Trenton, Princeton, and Monmouth. George Washington led his army across the state four times and encamped there during three hard winters, enduring some of the greatest setbacks of the war as well as seminal victories. New Jersey's decisive role in the conflict earned it the title, "Crossroads of the American Revolution".

New Jersey society was deeply polarized in their views and support of the revolution. Many citizens had emigrated from England and maintained a sense of loyalty to the British Crown; others had economic, social, or familial ties to the mother country. Among the most notable loyalists was the state governor, William Franklin, the illegitimate son of Benjamin Franklin, a leading revolutionary figure. Several Slaves joined sides with the British in return for promises of freedom. For example, Colonel Tye was a slave who escaped and joined the British army, leading constant raids against the people of New Jersey.

Throughout the Revolutionary War, there were many clashes between the Americans and British within the colony of New Jersey. In total, there were 296 engagements that occurred within New Jersey, more clashes than occurred in any other of the 13 colonies during the war.

== Prewar tensions ==
Following the French and Indian War, tensions erupted between the Americans and the British, in part, over who should pay for the war that resulted in the immense territorial gains for the British with their conquest of Quebec and French Canada. After Parliament issued the Sugar Act, the Stamp Act, and the Tea Act, furious protests and outbreaks occurred. One such outbreak occurred in Greenwich Township, New Jersey, in Cumberland County. On December 22, 1774, a group of 40 colonists entered the cellar of loyalist Daniel Bowen and quickly stole and burned chests of tea.

== Declaration of Independence ==
New Jersey representatives Richard Stockton, John Witherspoon, Francis Hopkinson, John Hart, and Abraham Clark were among the men who signed the United States Declaration of Independence. These men, just like all the others, took tremendous risks in order to fight for independence and all went on to serve their newly founded country for the rest of their lives.

Stockton was a New Jersey-born and College of New Jersey-educated attorney who sacrificed his royal judicial title and his considerable international economic interest in order to be an elected delegate for New Jersey at the Continental Congress. Witherspoon was a Scottish immigrant who came to New Jersey to serve as the sixth president of the College of New Jersey. He was a world-renowned Presbyterian minister who emerged as a leading delegate at the Continental Congress. Witherspoon went on to become one of the leaders of the new national Presbyterian church. Hopkinson was somewhat of a renaissance man who was articulate in several fields of the arts and a competent and capable scientist. Perhaps the capstone of his career was his appointment by President George Washington to the federal bench. Hart was a landowner and judge of the Hunterdon County court. Like Stockton, he sacrificed his high standing with the royal court and dedicated his life to the New Jersey General Assembly. After signing the Declaration of Independence, he went on to become the speaker of the New Jersey Assembly. The last of the men, Clark, was an Elizabethtown native who jumped from job to job, working as a farmer, surveyor, transporter, legal adviser, and finally as a politician. He was well liked in all these fields and was a prominent member of society who finally found his home in government.

== Battles ==
Washington's retreat across New Jersey in 1776

Besides being the location of several important battles, New Jersey was also helpful in disrupting British supply units. Forts on the Delaware River could attack British supply troops as they sailed to Philadelphia. Men in whaleboats crossed the Hudson and raided New York City and Long Island, and captured shipping in the Sandy Hook staging area outside New York Harbor. Ships based in south Jersey ports raided British shipping at sea. New Jersey also had several ironworks that provide iron and iron products, such as cannon, for the war effort, besides its food production. The Ford family in Morristown ran a black powder mill that supplied needed powder for the early war effort. The Continental army encamped three years in New Jersey, in the winters of 1777 at Morristown, 1778–79 at Middlebrook (near Bound Brook), and in 1780 again at Morristown. Large parts of the Continental forces wintered in other years in NJ. Raids from British-held New York City from across the Hudson into New Jersey happened very frequently. The British sent men into New Jersey looking for supplies, firewood, cattle, horses, sheep and pigs, and looking to capture leading patriots.

=== Battle of Fort Lee ===
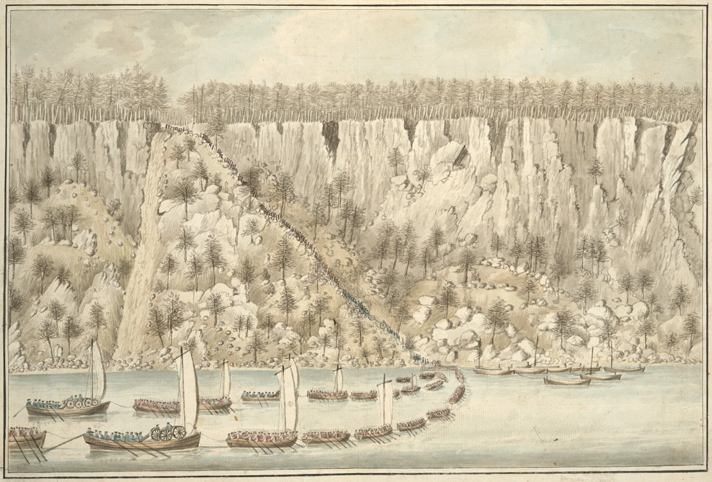
Depiction by Thomas Davies of the British invasion at the Palisades on November 20, 1776, near Fort Lee, New Jersey

The Revolutionary War did not start well for the Continental Army. After difficult losses in the Battle of Brooklyn, General George Washington led his troops towards Manhattan with the British Army in pursuit. On November 16, 1776, Fort Washington, at the northern tip of Manhattan Island, fell to the British.

On the morning of November 20, 1776, British soldiers under Charles Cornwallis captured Fort Lee after a hasty retreat by the American soldiers stationed there under the command of General Nathanael Greene. After gaining control of the Manhattan area, the British ferried up the Hudson River in barges. Washington had dashed off to warn the Americans about the advancing British, and the fort was evacuated. Much equipment and supplies were captured by the British.

Washington then led his 2,000 troops from Fort Lee in a retreat through present-day Englewood and Teaneck across the Hackensack River at New Bridge Landing. Washington continued his retreat through early December, passing through Princeton on the way to the Delaware River.

=== Ten Crucial Days ===
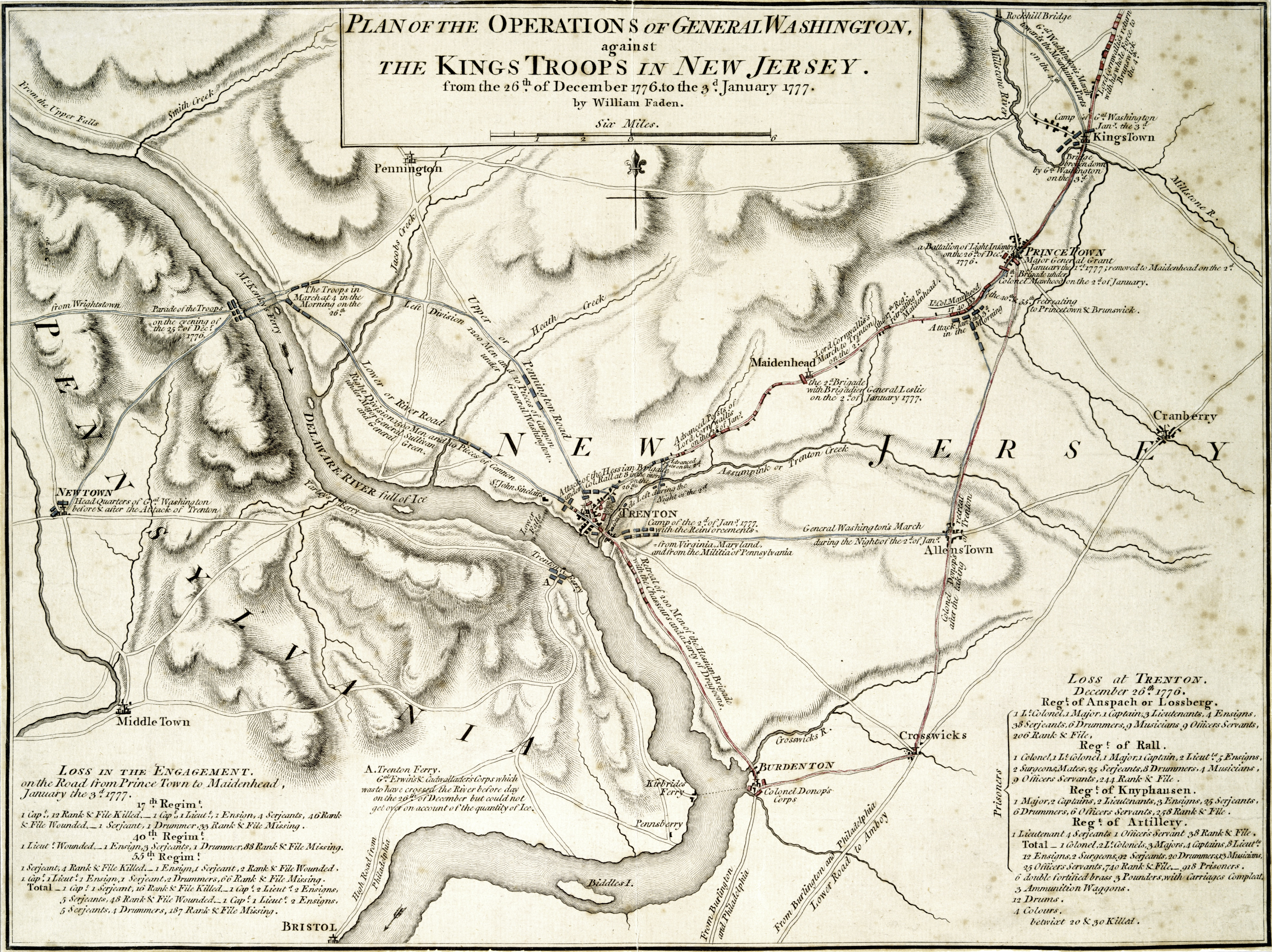
A military map assembled by William Faden featuring Revolutionary War troop movements during the Ten Crucial Days

The "Ten Crucial Days" were the days from December 25, 1776, to January 3, 1777, when several decisive battles, namely the battles of Trenton, Assunpink Creek and Princeton, were fought between the Continental Army under George Washington and the British army, mostly under Charles Cornwallis. Washington badly needed a victory to prove his army's hope of winning and thus boost morale. It is considered as one of the most significant military offensives in history. According to George Otto Trevelyan: "It may be doubted whether so small a number of men ever employed so short a space of time with greater and more lasting effects upon the history of the world." Frederick the Great called them "the most brilliant in the world’s history." President Coolidge called them "a military exploit of unparalleled brilliancy."

=== Battle of Trenton ===
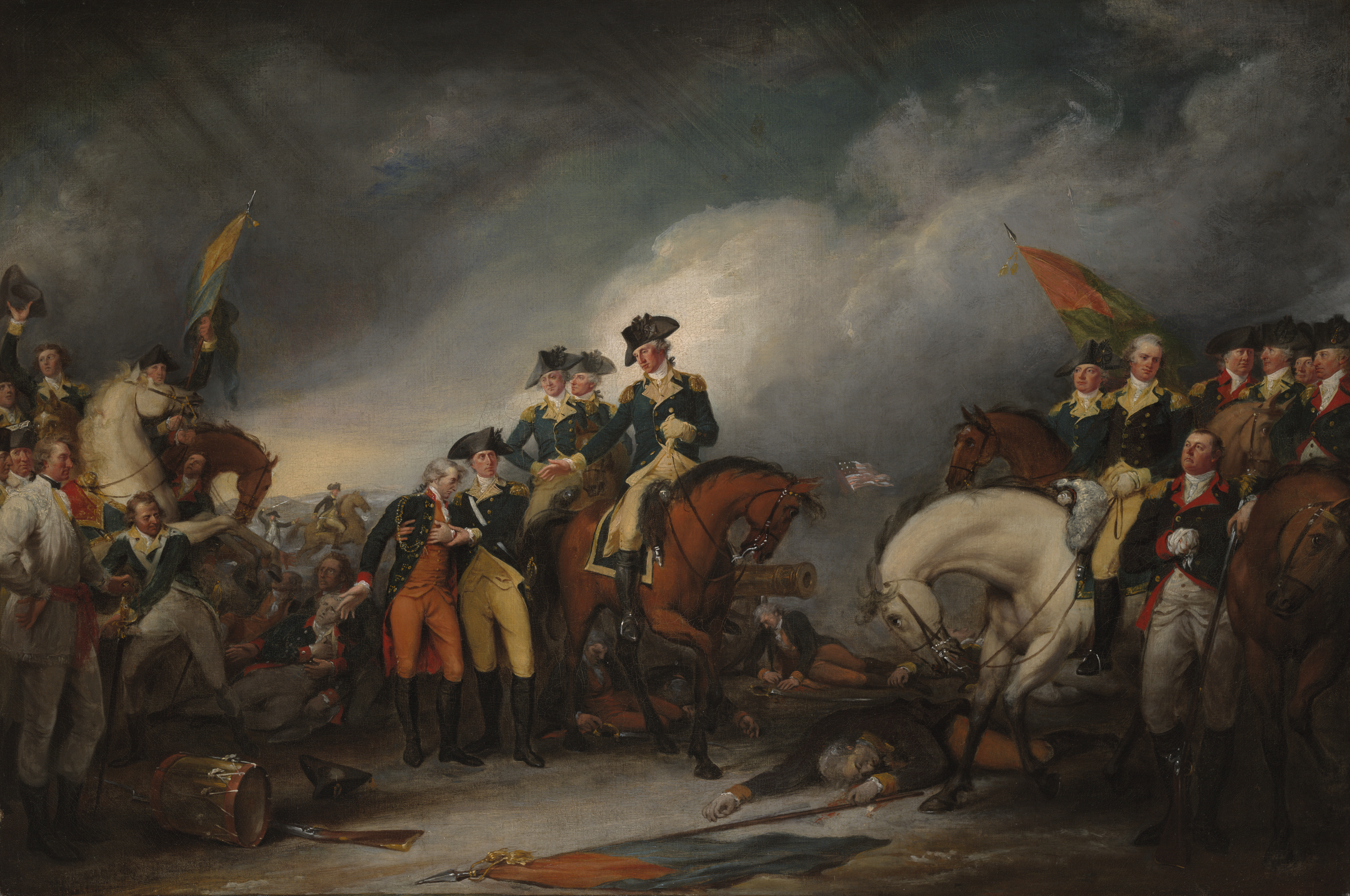
The Capture of the Hessians at Trenton, December 26, 1776, a portrait by John Trumbull

On the night of December 25–26, 1776, the Continental Army under the command of General George Washington made their crossing of the Delaware River. They took the Hessians stationed in Trenton by surprise; the Hessians were not prepared for an attack during a bad storm. In the ensuing Battle of Trenton in the morning of December 26, the Continental Army defeated the Hessians. The Americans attacked in groups, one down the two main streets from the Northeast, the other along the river road. The American cannons denied the Hessians the ability to form up in the streets. The Hessians unsuccessfully attempted to retreat and were completely surrounded by the Continental Army. As a result of the battle, the Americans captured nearly 900 Hessian soldiers within 90 minutes. In addition, they took the supplies that had been placed in Trenton for use by the British army. Washington then had the soldiers recross safely back into Pennsylvania. The battle helped to increase the waning confidence of the Continental Congress.

=== Battle of the Assunpink Creek ===
On January 2, 1777, Cornwallis had hoped to engage Washington's army at Trenton after George Washington recrossed the Delaware River, resulting in the Battle of the Assunpink Creek, also known as the Second Battle of Trenton. Cornwallis's initial results were failures. After recapturing Trenton, he ordered charges on defenses fortified by Washington at Assunpink Creek. The Americans, from their defenses, fired volleys at the advancing troops, striking heavy casualties in the British army. Later that night, Washington moved the majority of his army on a surprise attack upon British troops stationed at Princeton. At the same time, he left a few troops to stall Cornwallis by creating false signals (campfires, loud noises, fortification repair) to give the impression that the Continental Army was still stationed in Trenton.

=== Battle of Princeton ===
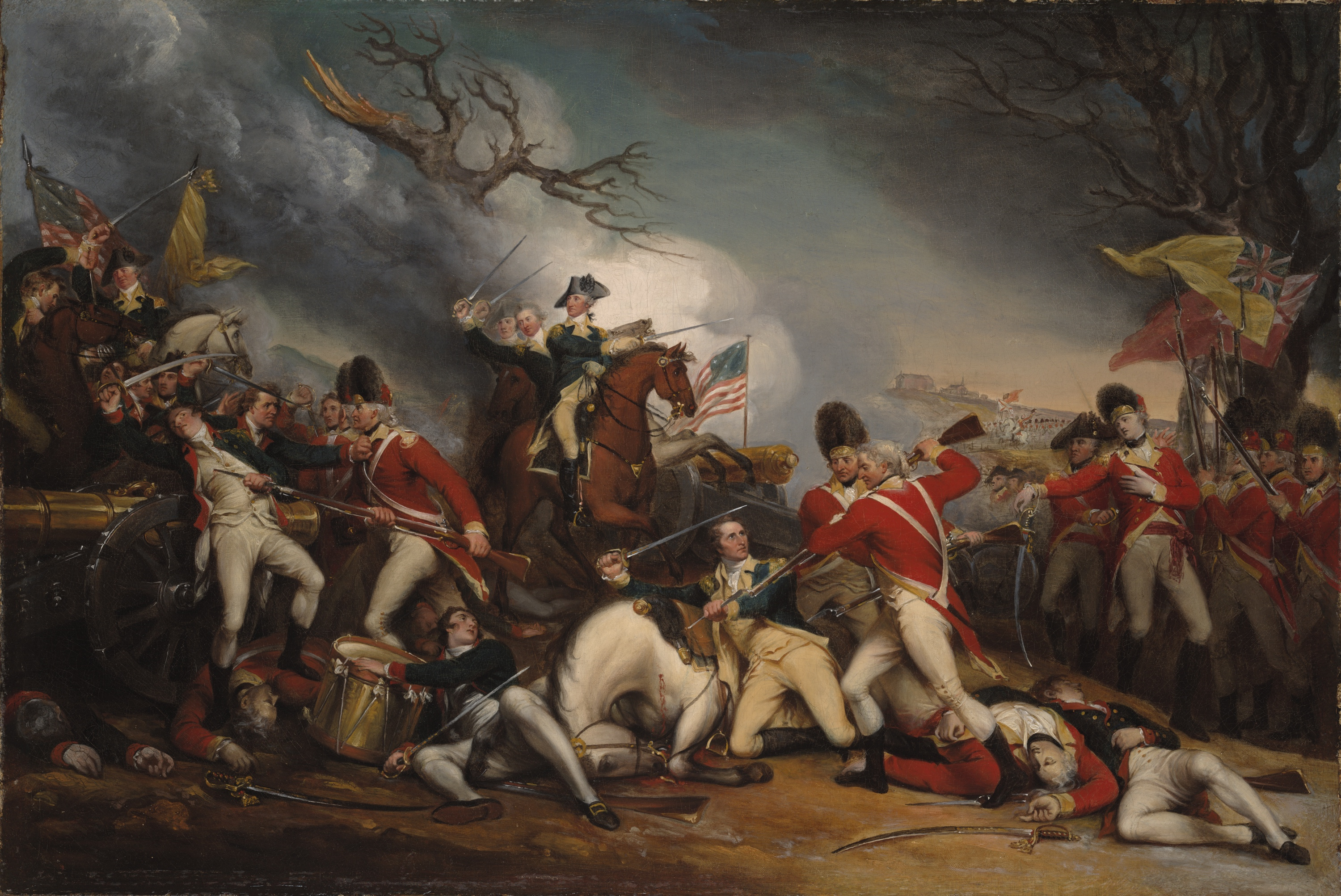
The Death of General Mercer at the Battle of Princeton, January 3, 1777, a portrait by John Trumbull

On January 3, 1777, the Continental Army commanded by Washington defeated the British army under Cornwallis at the Battle of Princeton. The initial contact at Princeton was between General Hugh Mercer's advance corp moving toward the Stoney Brook along Quaker Bridge road, against British Col. Charles Mawhood, who was leading most of the 55th regiment and other additional troops toward Trenton. As Mawhood crossed the Stoney Brook, both sides spotted the other. Both sides moved to a nearby hill above the Princeton Road (now US 206). Mawhood opened fire as the Americans came over the ridge, and followed with a bayonet charge. Mercer's men, armed mostly with rifles, were driven off, and Mercer was wounded by bayonets (he died several days later). More American militia moved up to support Mercer, while another column led by General Sullivan moved on the town from the south.

The advancing Militia were also repelled by Mawhood's regiment, although Mawhood was outnumbered 3 or 4 to one, but he and his men stood steadfast. Washington himself lead up more Continentals and encouraged the militia to return to the fight. After a few volleys Mawhood was forced to retreat across the Stoney Brook.

After driving in a detachment of the 55th regiment, Sullivan marched into Princeton. Most of the remaining British forces retreated toward New Brunswick but some took up a defensive position in the stone university building, Nassau Hall.

The Americans set up cannons facing Nassau Hall of Princeton University, and two cannonballs made contact with the walls of the hall. The British soldiers at Princeton were soon forced to surrender to the Americans, and Nassau Hall was recaptured. Cornwallis immediately moved to bring his army to engage Washington. This attempt failed due to a delaying force which damaged the Stoney Point Bridge and delayed the British. These two victories, and the resulting resurgence of the militias from New Jersey, Pennsylvania, Delaware, New York and Connecticut, forced the British out of most of New Jersey, boosting the morale of the Americans. The British were soon forced into an enclave around New Brunswick, giving up the rest of New Jersey."

=== Battle of Millstone ===
Also known as the battle of Van Nest's Mills, the Battle of Millstone occurred on January 20, 1777. Following the battle of Princeton, Washington's soldiers traveled north following the Millstone River to Somerset Court House (now Millstone, New Jersey), then proceeded to Morristown.

From New Brunswick, a British foraging party of a few hundred men also went to Somerset Court House, reaching Van Nest’s Mill (present day Manville, New Jersey). After seizing flour and livestock, the British unit set up defenses on the Millstone River, including 3 cannons. The militia posted in the area managed to surprise the British party by crossing the cold, waist deep, river and capture many men and to seize back the supplies.

General Dickinson Raritan, New Jersey, January 23: "I have the pleasure to inform you that on Monday last with about 450 men chiefly our militia I attacked a foraging party near V. Nest Mills consisting of 500 men with 2 field pieces, which we routed after an engagement of 20 minutes and brought off 107 horses, 49 wagons, 115 cattle, 70 sheep, 40 barrels of flour - 106 bags and many other things, 49 prisoners."

=== Battle of Bound Brook ===
The Battle of Bound Brook resulted in a shallow defeat of the Americans stationed at Bound Brook, New Jersey, on April 13, 1777. A four-prong attack by 4,000 British upon Bound Brook ensued, and the Americans, who put up a fierce resistance at first, retreated. Around 60 casualties occurred on the American side, while only a single British soldier was killed. On the same day, Nathanael Greene recaptured Bound Brook, but George Washington realized the difficulty of defending the place.

=== Battle of Short Hills ===
After advancing to Millstone, New Jersey, on June 26, 1777, General Howe found that Washington would not move his army out of the strong position on the Watchung Mountains north of Middlebrook. Planning to attack Philadelphia, but unable to go safely through New Jersey with its militia nipping away at his men, he had to move his men back to New Brunswick to board shipping.

As the British forces moved back, Washington had some generals move forward, looking for an opportunity to attack a weakened foe. When General Lord Stirling had moved his men to the area near Scotch Plains and Edison, then known as the Short Hills, suddenly the hunter became the hunted when Howe sent a larger force to attack them.

The Americans, though hard pressed, managed to avoid being mangled or destroyed and fought a delaying battle while most of the American force escaped the trap.

Washington, who had finally moved out of the Watchung Mountains, moved back and ordered his commands around New Brunswick to do the same.

With the Americans moved away from his boarding troops, Howe was able to put his men aboard ships and abandon New Jersey in relative security. The British left New Brunswick and Staten Island to later attack Philadelphia.

=== Battle of Monmouth ===
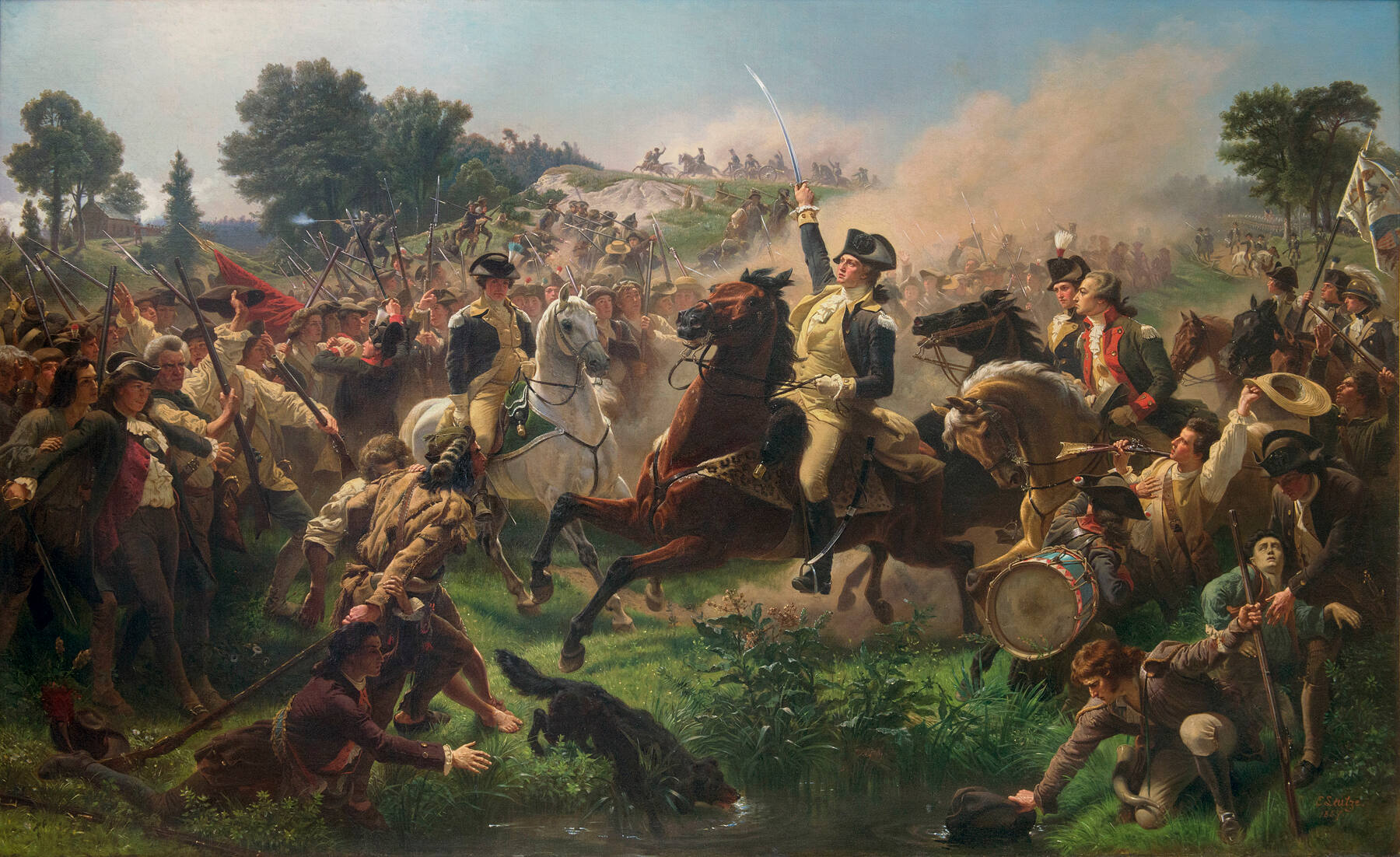
Washington Rallying the Troops at Monmouth, a portrait by Emanuel Leutze

In 1778, the British retreated to New York City to protect it from an expected French attack. Washington quickly ordered his soldiers to march towards the British and met them at the Battle of Monmouth, fought near Monmouth Court House in present-day Freehold Borough.

On June 28, 1778, the Continental Army under George Washington met a British column under Sir Henry Clinton. George Washington hoped to surprise the rear of the British army and overwhelm them. General Charles Lee led the American attack on the British rear but retreated quickly when the British attempted to flank the Americans. The retreat nearly led to massive disorder, but Washington managed to personally rally the troops to withstand the British counterattacks. The British attempted two attacks to defeat the Americans; both failed. As exceedingly high temperatures continued to increase over 100 °F (38 °C), many soldiers fell to sunstroke.

After the battle, Charles Lee requested his own court martial to defend against accusations made against his actions in the initial attack. Over 1,000 British casualties were incurred; the Americans lost about 452 men. This battle inspired the legend of Molly Pitcher.

=== Baylor Massacre ===
The Baylor Massacre was an attack on September 27, 1778, upon the 3rd Regiment of Continental Light Dragoons under the command of Colonel George Baylor during the American Revolutionary War. It occurred in the present day town of River Vale, New Jersey. During the night, local Loyalists informed the British of their location. Only using their bayonets to avoid making excess noise, a British force attacked the dragoons, killing 15 and injuring or capturing 54 more..

=== Battle of Paulus Hook ===
Paulus Hook was a peninsula at what is now Jersey City, and a major landing point for anyone going from New York City into New Jersey. Since it was on the Hudson River, the British fleet was able to protect it. The British used it to send raiders into Bergen County. Militia tried to stand guard to prevent or harass these raiders.

The Battle of Paulus Hook was fought on August 19, 1779, between Colonial and British forces. The patriots were led by Light Horse Harry Lee, and launched a night attack on the British-controlled fort. They surprised the British, taking several prisoners, but had to withdraw before daylight when the British navy could react. The fort continued to be used as a base of operations against Bergen County patriots.

=== Battle of Connecticut Farms ===
On June 6, 1780, British troops boarded boats on Staten Island bound for Elizabeth, New Jersey. At midnight, 5,000 troops started to land. They expected the Continental Army to give little resistance, believing that they were tired of the war and were poorly fed and paid. They also expected the citizens of New Jersey to welcome them. They were wrong on both counts.

Once they began to march into Elizabeth, they were attacked by Lt. Ogden, who was stationed to give an alarm outside of town with a small group of men. Ogden had orders to fire one volley and retreat. That volley wounded British General Stirling in the thigh, and delayed the advance several hours.

The New Jersey Brigade of the Continental Army, in and around Elizabeth, moved back toward Connecticut Farms, now Union Township, New Jersey, sending word to Morristown to the main army under Washington. The New Jersey brigade was heavily outnumbered. The warnings to the militia also went out, and they began to form up and march toward the British from as far away as Hopewell, New Jersey.

When the British did advance, they were attacked by the militia on the flanks. This drew off significant portions of their forces to protect their supply line and route of travel.

General William Maxwell, commanding the New Jersey Brigade, set up a defense at defiles on the road to Connecticut Farms. After a day of hot fighting, the British realized they could not easily breakthrough toward the Hobart Gap leading to Morristown, and, after burning the town, retired back to Elizabeth point.

=== Battle of Springfield ===
The last major battle to take place in New Jersey and the rest of the Northern states during the Revolutionary War was the Battle of Springfield. Baron von Knyphausen, the Hessian general, hoped to invade New Jersey and expected support from the colonists of New Jersey who were tired of the war. His goal was to secure Hobart Gap, from which he could attack the American headquarters situated in Morristown. On June 23, 1780, the British attacked soldiers and militia under the command of Nathanael Greene. General Greene successfully stopped a two-pronged attack from positions held across the Rahway River. The victory prevented a British attack on Morristown and its military stores. Nathanael Greene's personal assistant was Thomas Paine.

=== Final skirmishes ===
Several small conflicts and skirmishes took place in New Jersey just before and after the Battle of Yorktown, representing the final conflicts of the American Revolution. The Skirmish at Manahawkin took place on December 30 & 31, 1781 when militiamen clashed with John Bacon and approximately 30 and 40 men, resulting in one death and one injury.

On October 25, 1782, after formal hostilities between the United States and Britain paused, Bacon and his men murdered 19 men in their sleep, including Patriot militia Captain Andrew Steelman, in what is known as the Long Beach Island Massacre.

On December 9, 1782, Lieutenant Nicholas Morgan, age 28, was guarding the shore of South Amboy when he was ambushed by Loyalist "refugees" from New York. Morgan may have been the last officer of the Continental Army to die in the American Revolution.

The Affair at Cedar Bridge in Barnegat Township was the last conflict between British allied forces of the American Revolution which took place in December 1782. One Patriot was killed, and four were wounded. Four Loyalists were wounded, including Bacon.

== Support and encouragement generated by newspaper ==
The New Jersey Journal was the second newspaper to begin publishing in New Jersey. It was edited and printed by Shepard Kollock, who established his press in Chatham in 1779. This paper became a catalyst in the revolution. News of events regarding the war came directly to the editor from Washington's headquarters in nearby Morristown to boost the morale of the troops and their families, and as editor, he conducted lively debates about the efforts for independence with those who opposed and supported the cause he championed. Kollock later relocated the paper twice, first to New Brunswick when the military action shifted there, and later in 1785, when he established his last publication location in Elizabeth under the same name. The Journal ceased publication in 1992.

== New Jersey State Constitution ==
In 1776, the first New Jersey State Constitution was drafted. It was written during the period of the Revolutionary War, and was designed to create a basic framework for the state government. The constitution recognized the right of suffrage for women and black men who met certain property requirements. The New Jersey Constitution of 1776 gives the vote to "all inhabitants of this Colony, of full age, who are worth fifty pounds proclamation money." This included blacks, spinsters, and widows. (Married women could not own property under the common law.) It had been held that this was an accident of hasty drafting: the British were at Staten Island when the constitution was proclaimed. The Constitution declares itself temporary, and it was to be void if there was reconciliation with Great Britain.

Both sides in elections mocked the other for relying on "petticoat electors" and each accused the other of letting unqualified women (including married women) vote. A Federalist legislature passed a voting rights act which applied only to those counties where the Federalists were strong. A Democratic legislature extended it to the entire state. In 1807, as a side-effect of a reconciliation within the Democratic Party, the legislature reinterpreted the constitution (which had been an ordinary act of the Provincial Congress) to mean universal white male suffrage, with no property requirement. However, they disenfranchised paupers, to suppress the Irish vote.

== After the war ==
In the summer of 1783, the Second Continental Congress met in Nassau Hall at Princeton University in Princeton. It had originally convened in Philadelphia, but mutinous troops in Philadelphia prevented the Congress from meeting there. Princeton became the temporary capital for the newly independent nation briefly over these four months. In Princeton, the Continental Congress was informed of the end of the war by the signing of the Treaty of Paris on September 3, 1783. The chief dignitary of the meeting was George Washington, and a portrait was made of Washington during the meeting. On December 18, 1787, New Jersey became the third state to ratify the Constitution. On November 20, 1789, New Jersey became the first state in the nation to ratify the Bill of Rights.

New Jersey played a principal role in creating the structure of the new United States government. When Virginia delegates came up with the Virginia Plan, which called for representation in government proportional to the population of each state, the smaller states refused, fearing that with such a plan they would no longer have a say in government affairs. William Paterson, a New Jersey statesman, introduced the New Jersey Plan, which provided for one vote to be given to each state, providing equal representation within the legislative body. Under the Great Compromise, both plans were placed into use with two separate bodies in the Congress, and the U.S. Senate being modeled after the New Jersey Plan.

== See also ==
- Crossroads of the American Revolution National Heritage Area
- History of New Jersey
- Province of New Jersey
