= Frederick Roth =

American sculptor (1872–1944)

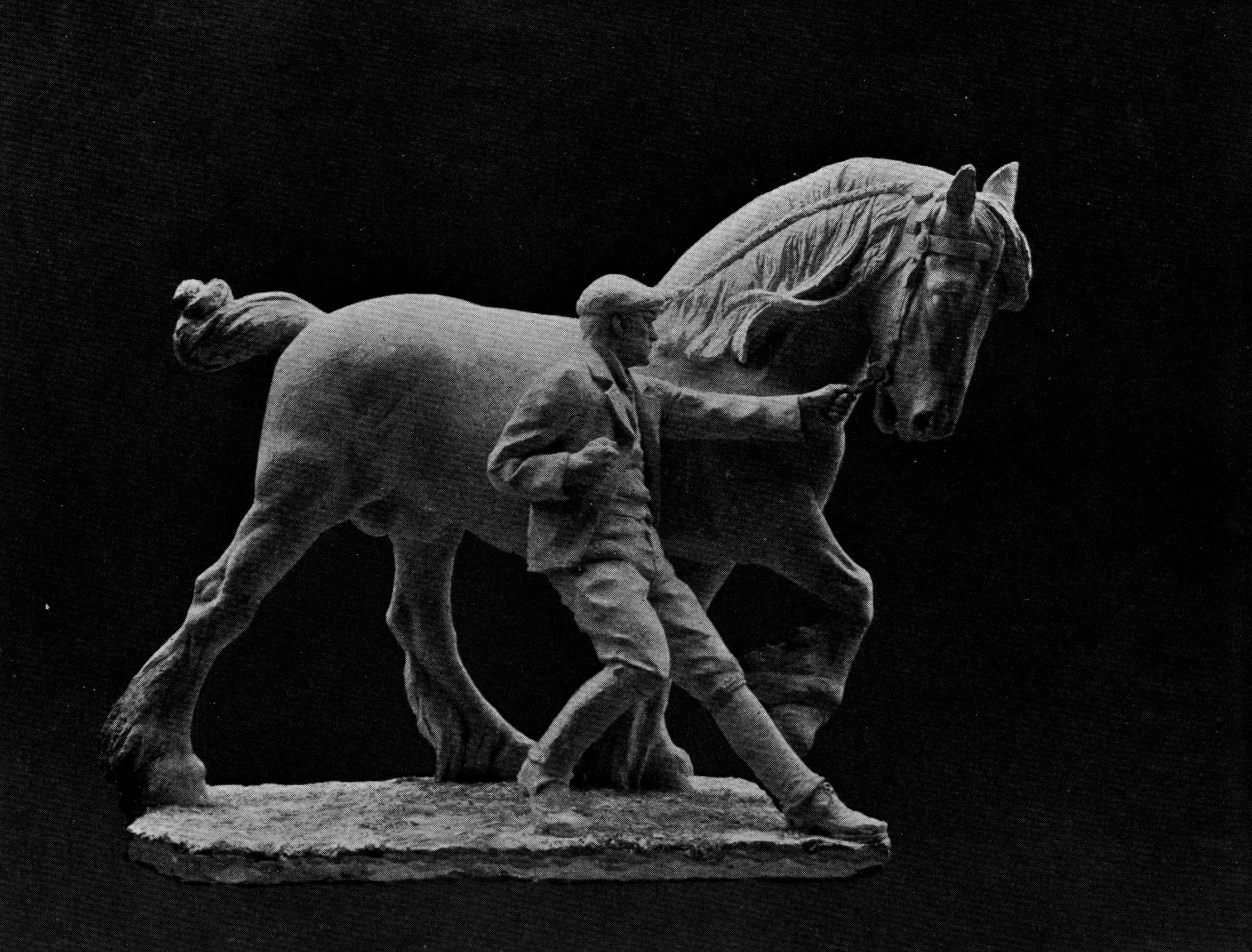
Roth's Horse Tamer, from the Pan-American Exposition

Frederick George Richard Roth (1872 – 1944) often referred to as F.G.R. Roth, was an American sculptor and animalier, well known for portraying living animals. The statue of the sled dog Balto in New York City's Central Park is perhaps his most famous piece.

== Biography ==
Roth was born in Brooklyn, New York, and briefly worked in his father's business. He was the brother of suffragette Laura Witte. He traveled to Europe, where he took art classes in several countries, including the Academy of Fine Arts, Vienna, and the Royal Academy in Berlin. He also studied animals in their natural habitat. When he returned to the United States, he continued his schooling at the New York Academy. By 1900, he was working professionally as a sculptor.

Roth won awards at the Pan-American Exposition (1901) in Buffalo, the Louisiana Purchase Exposition (1904) in St. Louis, and the Panama-Pacific International Exposition (1915) in San Francisco, and at another World's Fair in Buenos Aires. He became the president of the National Sculpture Society. From 1934 to 1936, he worked under the Works Projects Administration as the head sculptor for the New York City Department of Parks and Recreation. He was elected to the National Academy of Design in 1906. He died at his home in Englewood, New Jersey on May 21, 1944.

== Works ==
- Kit Carson Monument in Trinidad, Colorado, (1913), in which Roth executed the horse while Augustus Lukeman created the figure of Carson.
- Mother Goose Monument, Central Park, New York City, (1938).
- Bronze lion at Baker Field, the sports stadium of Columbia University.
- Justin Morgan Monument in front of the University of Vermont Morgan Horse Farm, Middlebury, Vermont (1921)
- Equestrian statue of George Washington in Morristown, New Jersey, (1927–1928)
- "Mining", pediment on the Department of Commerce Building, Washington D.C., (1943)

=== Balto ===
His statue of Balto was unveiled on December 17, 1925, and was the first statue in the city to honor a dog. The black Siberian Husky became famous during the 1925 serum run to Nome, which saved the children of the city from a diphtheria epidemic.

The statue is bronze, and is set on a large granite rock near the entrance of Central Park at East 67th Street, by the Tisch Children's Zoo. A plaque on the front is engraved with seven sled dogs running through a blizzard, and the following words:

Dedicated to the indomitable spirit of the sled dogs that relayed antitoxin six hundred miles over rough ice, across treacherous waters, through Arctic blizzards from Nenana to the relief of stricken Nome in the Winter of 1925.
ENDURANCE FIDELITY INTELLIGENCE

The statue is popular among tourists, especially children.

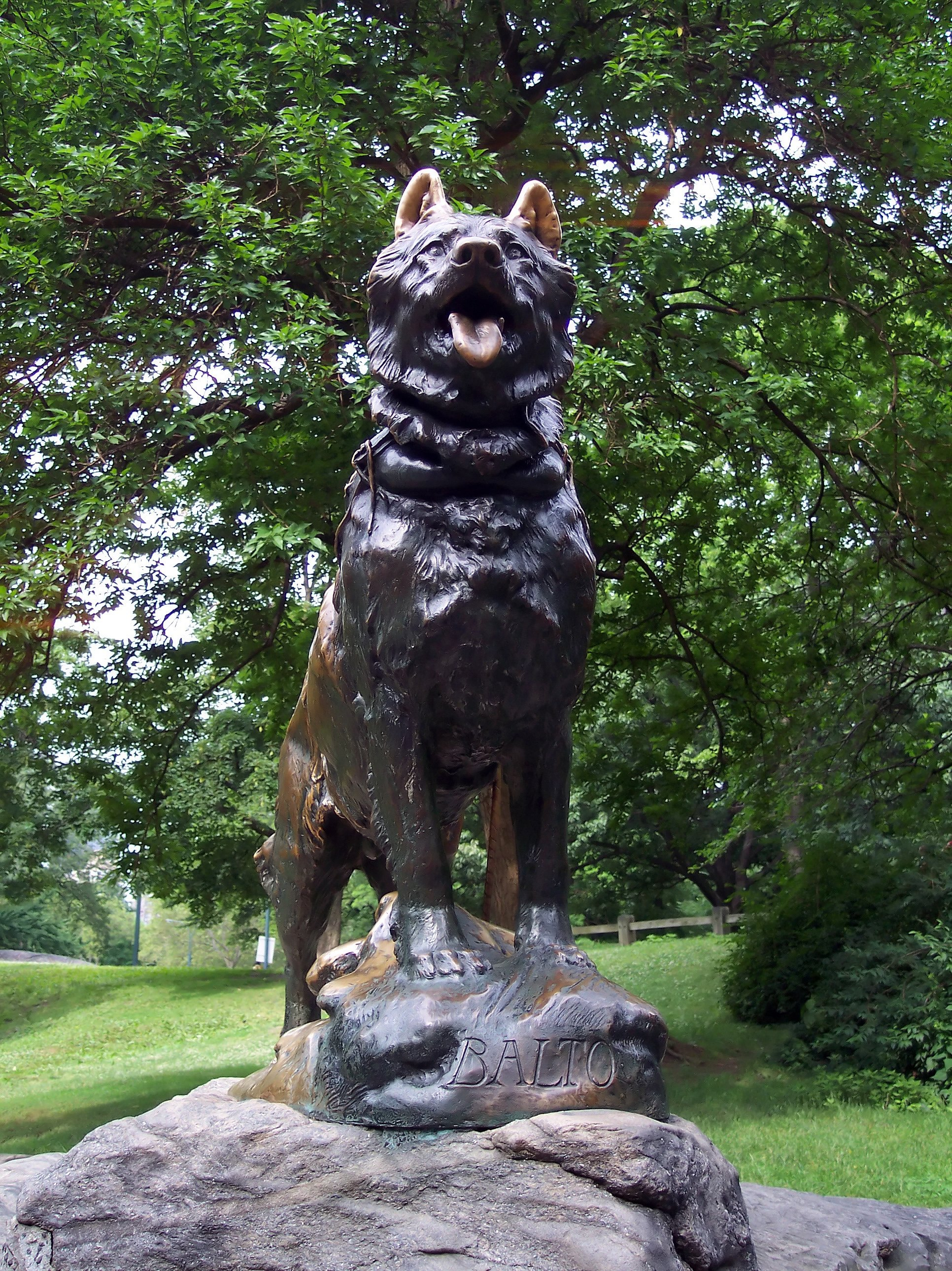
Balto (1925), Central Park, New York City.

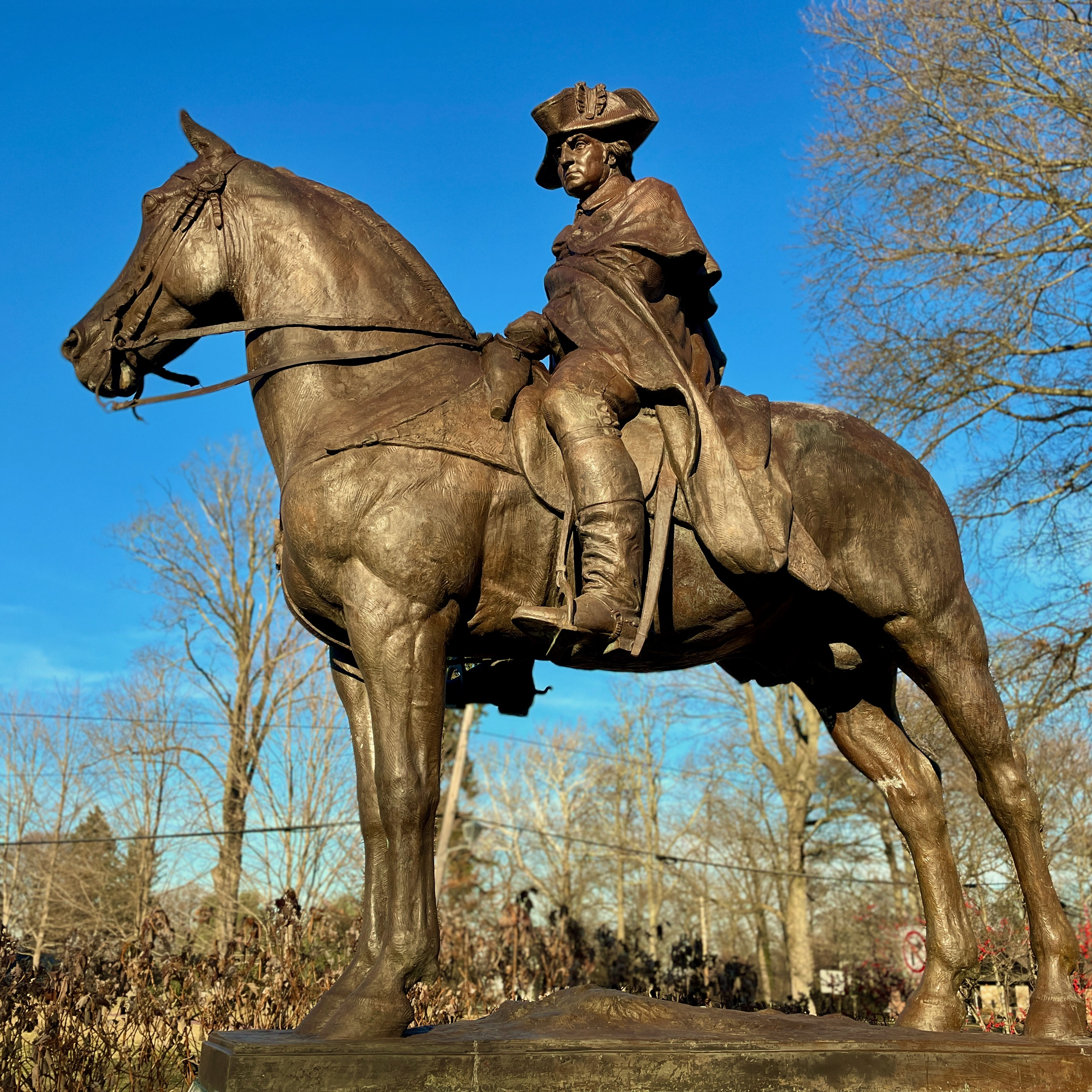
George Washington (1927–1928), Morristown, New Jersey

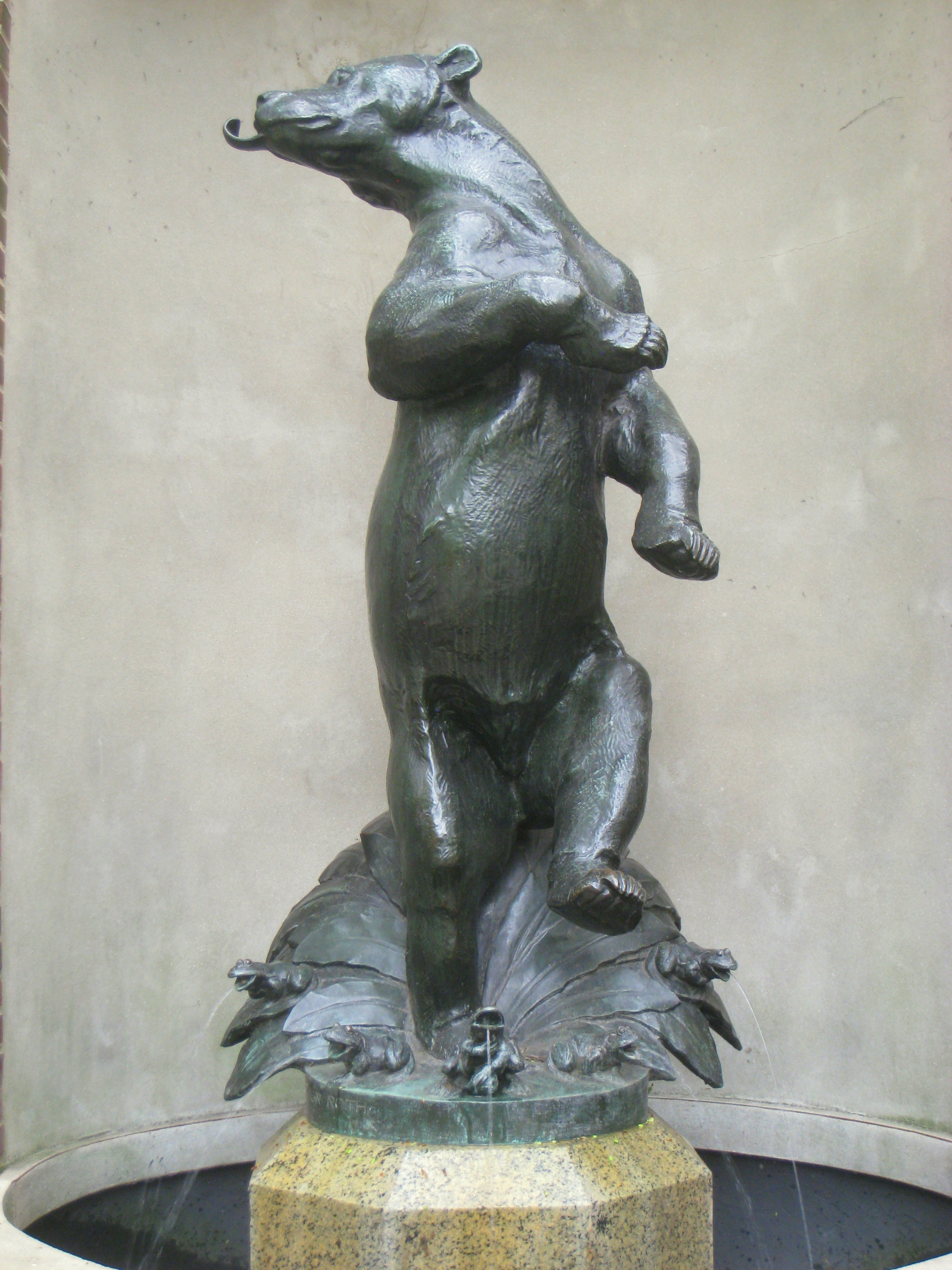
Dancing Bear (1937), Central Park, New York City.
