= Statue of Balto =

Statue in Central Park, Manhattan, New York, U.S.

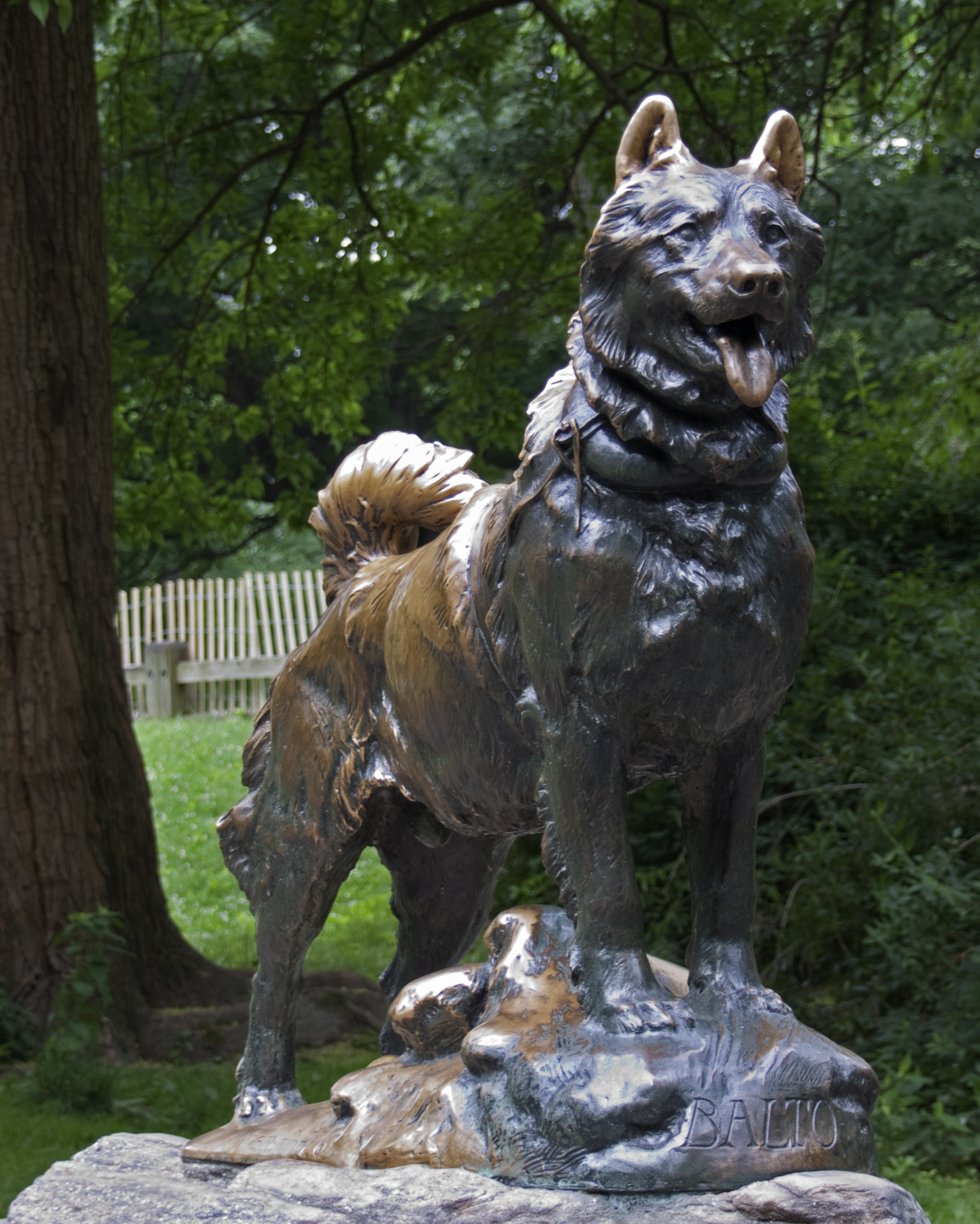
- The statue in 2010
- Artist: Frederick Roth
- Year: 1925
- Subject: Balto
- Location: New York City, New York, U.S.; 40°46′11.9″N 73°58′15.7″W

A bronze statue of Balto by Frederick Roth is installed in Central Park, Manhattan, New York. Balto (1919 – March 14, 1933) was an Alaskan husky and sled dog belonging to musher and breeder Leonhard Seppala. He achieved fame when he led a team of sled dogs on the final leg of the 1925 serum run to Nome, in which diphtheria antitoxin was transported from Anchorage, Alaska, to Nenana, Alaska, by train and then to Nome by dog sled to combat an outbreak of the disease.

== Description and history ==
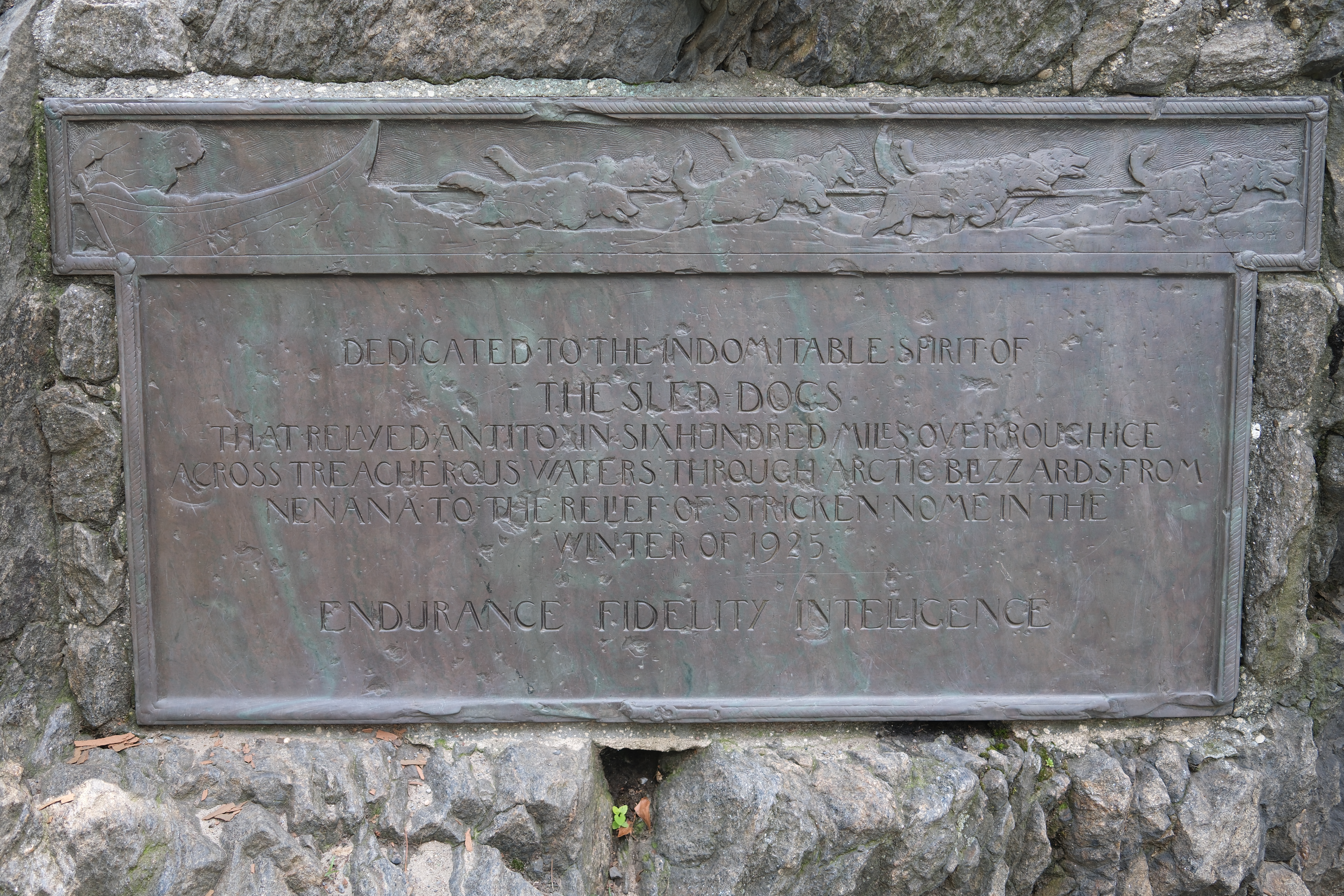
Memorial plaque beneath the statue

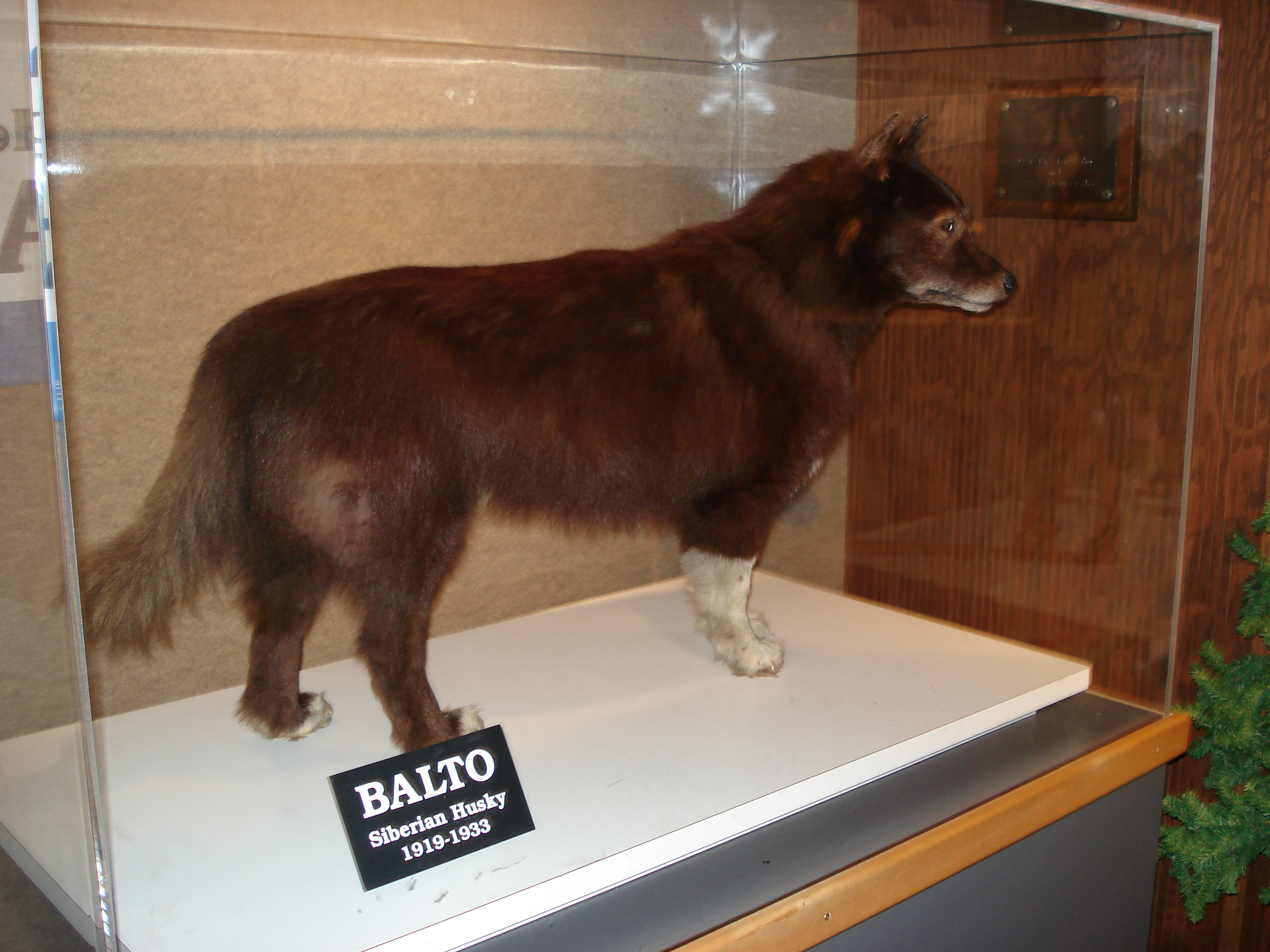
Balto's remains at the Cleveland Museum of Natural History

Located north of the Central Park Zoo near the intersection of East Drive and 67th Street, the sculpture was dedicated on December 17, 1925. Roth modeled the sculpture of Balto on a New Hampshire malamute named Chinook. A bas-relief rendering of the pivotal journey is carved into the pedestal. Balto himself was reportedly present at the ceremony, making him the only subject of a Central Park statue to be present at its dedication.

The statue is a popular attraction: children frequently climb the statue to pretend to ride on the dog. There is a plaque at the base of the statue, which reads:

"Dedicated to the indomitable spirit of the sled dogs that relayed antitoxin six hundred miles over rough ice, across treacherous waters, through Arctic blizzards from Nenana to the relief of stricken Nome in the Winter of 1925. Endurance · Fidelity · Intelligence".

== Legacy ==
The statue was used at the ending scene of the 1995 Universal Pictures animated film Balto. In September 2022, actor Kevin Bacon, who did the voice of Balto in the animated film, visited the statue during a walk. He posted a short video of himself endearingly commenting on the statue and his film role on his social media accounts, entitling the short video "Ran into an old friend of mine in the park #Balto".

In 2019, the cast and crew of the film The Great Alaskan Race paid a visit to the statue.

== See also ==
- 1925 in art
