= Ford Mansion =

- U.S. Historic district – Contributing property
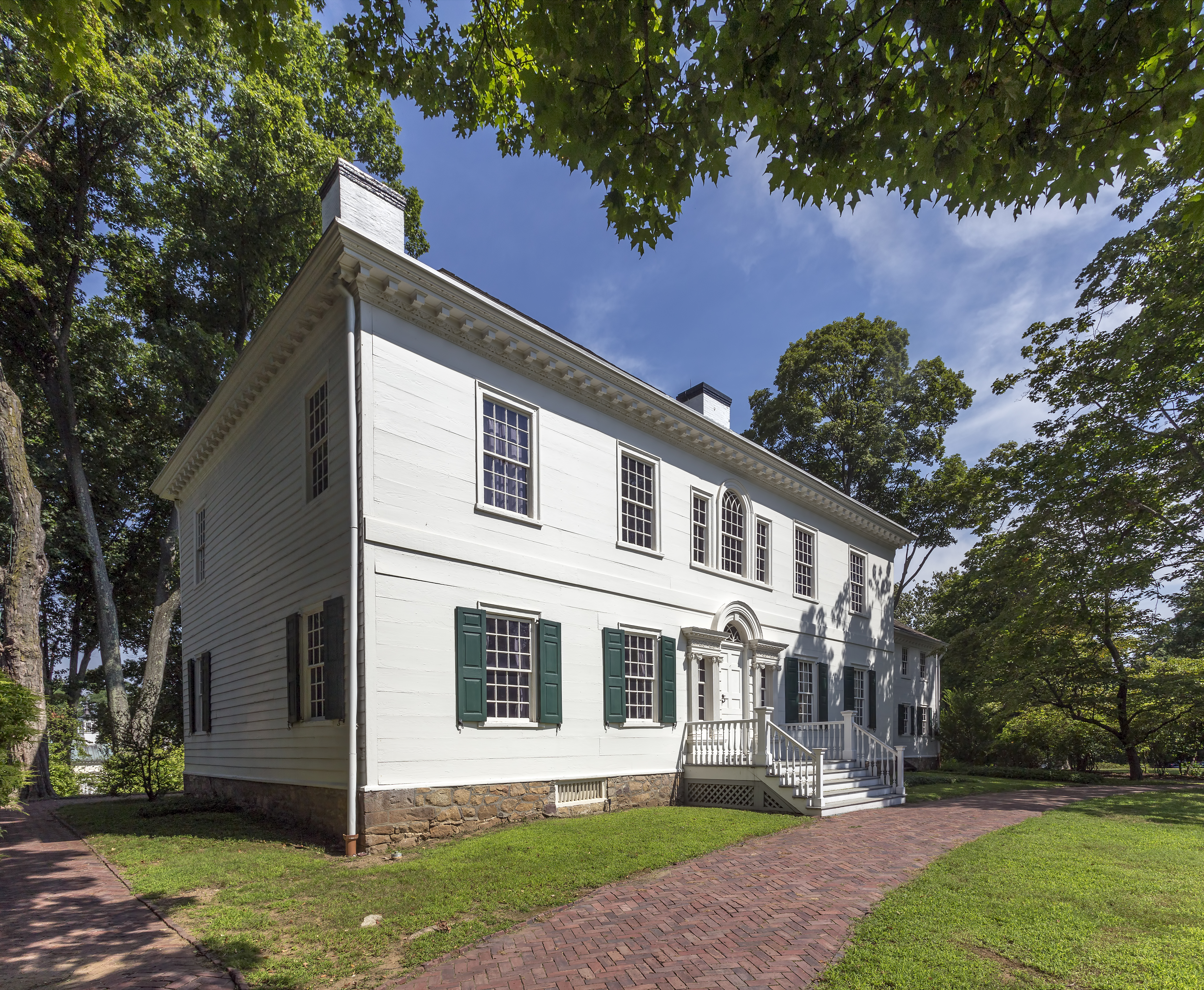
- Ford Mansion, George Washington's Revolutionary War headquarters from December 1779 to June 1780

- Location within Morris County, New Jersey Location within New Jersey Location within the United States
- Location: 30 Washington Place; Morristown, New Jersey, U.S.
- Coordinates: 40°47′47″N 74°28′00″W
- Built: 1774
- Built by: Jacob Ford, Jr.
- Architectural style: Georgian style
- Part of: Morristown National Historical Park (ID66000053)
- Designated CP: October 15, 1966

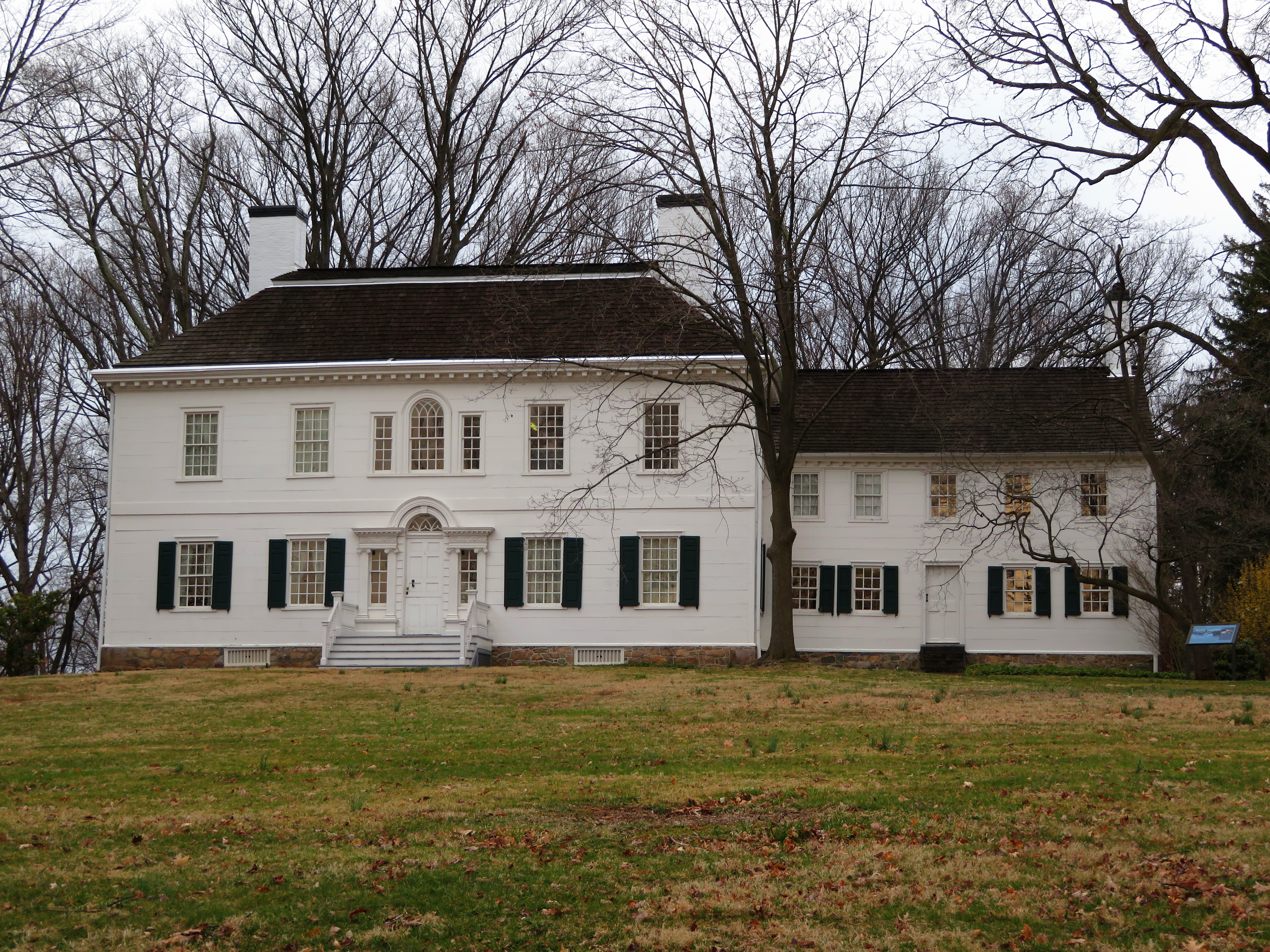
Ford Mansion in Morristown, New Jersey, Washington's headquarters from 1779 to 1780

The Ford Mansion, also known as Washington's Headquarters, is a classic 18th-century American home located at 30 Washington Place in Morristown, New Jersey that served as General George Washington's headquarters from December 1779 to June 1780 during the American Revolutionary War.

The house was built in Georgian architectural style in 1774 by Jacob Ford Jr. It is now owned by the National Park Service. It was acquired by the Washington Association of New Jersey in 1873. It was added to the National Register of Historic Places on October 15, 1966 as part of the Morristown National Historical Park.

== Architecture ==
The house has a Georgian-style exterior, but the interior kitchen and framing shows evidence of Dutch influence. According to Alan Gowan, "the boarding of the Ford Mansion was laid evenly painted and scored to look like a fine masonry with quoins at the corners". The mansion has a palladian window above the door and a stylish cornice. The fancy architecture was not created to look appealing, but to showcase the wealth of the family who owned the building.

The headmaster's section of the house was built with symmetrical rooms on both sides of the foyer. The office is across from the library, and the parlor is across from the dining room. On the second floor, there are symmetrical bedrooms on each side of the hallway. The servant's section of the house was near the kitchen and the pantry on the east side. The grand hall and the parlor are what categorize the house as a mansion. The Ford Mansion used painted flush boards and clapboards for the exterior rather than brick, which was more common at the time.

== Location ==
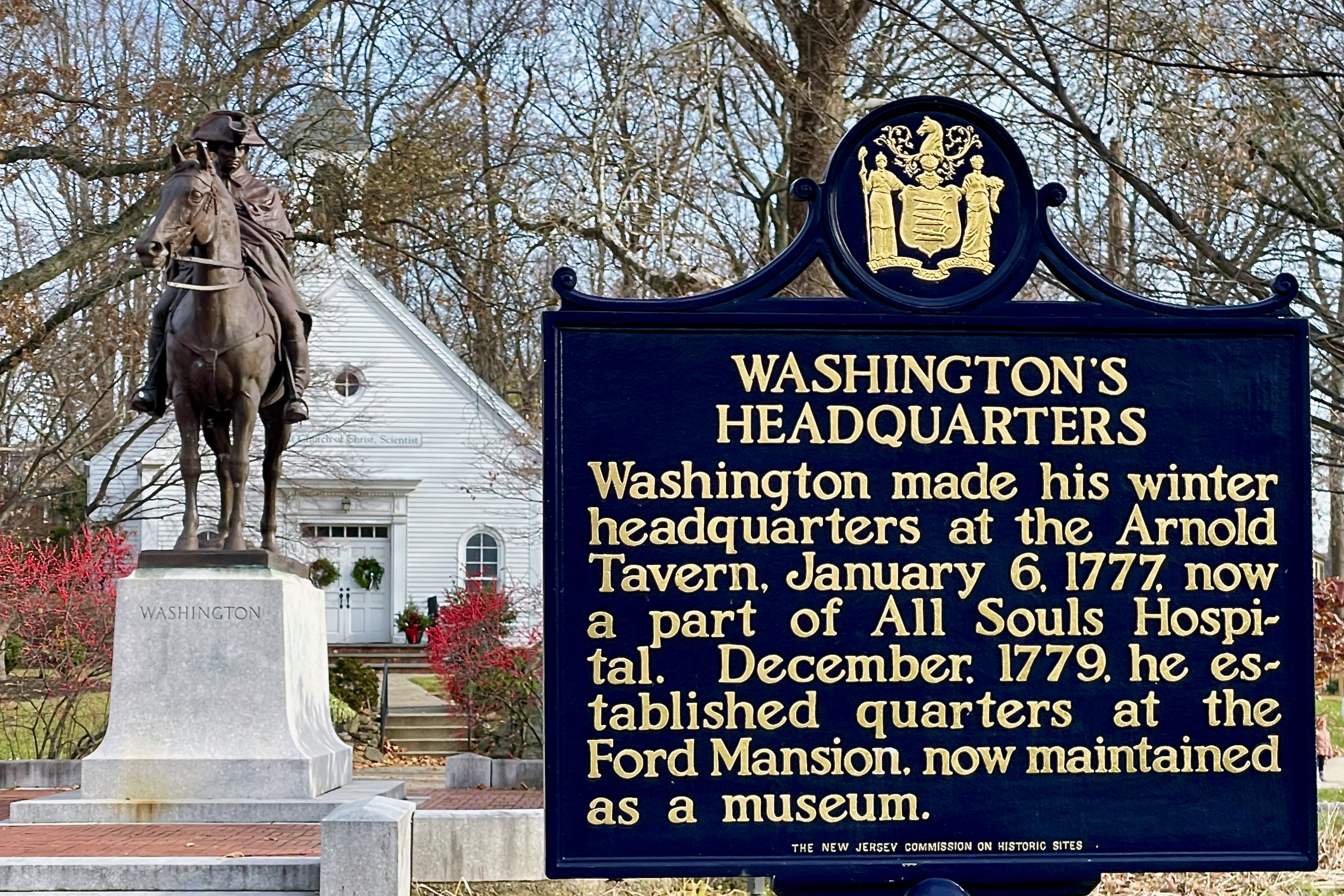
Washington's Headquarters sign by the equestrian statue of George Washington

George Washington and the Continental Army were obliged to set up an encampment in Morristown because of transportation problems. Washington liked Morristown's "defensible terrain, important communication routes, and access to critical resources.". The Ford family had businesses in iron mines and forges, a gristmill, a hemp-mill, and a gunpowder mill that were all stationed near the house. These businesses were useful to the army in getting resources.

The surrounding community was made up of 250 residents and 70 buildings. In 1777, many high-ranking officials rented these houses. Unfortunately, an epidemic of smallpox spread through the town from the soldiers, making the townspeople somewhat bitter to Washington's troops when they arrived in 1779.

Washington's army was stationed at Jockey Hollow while Washington stayed in Ford Mansion. Jockey Hollow is five miles south of Washington's Headquarters.

== Ownership ==
The Ford Mansion was originally owned by Colonel Jacob Ford Jr. He was given the deed to the two hundred acres of land by his father in 1762, which was the same year he married Theodosia Johnes. Before serving in the war, Jacob Jr. and his father owned an iron forge in Whippany, New Jersey. Ford built the house just south of the Whippany River, making it easier to travel to work.

Ford was the Eastern Battalion Commander of the Morris County Militia. He died from pneumonia on January 11, 1777 in the mansion house, and 35 Delaware troops witnessed his death.

Ford and his soldiers captured a bronze six-pounder field cannon from the British Army on January 3, 1777 at the victory in Princeton, New Jersey. According to Morristown National Historical Park, "with artillery and arms in short supply, the victory at Princeton not only boosted the morale of the Continental Army, but it bolstered their scant arsenal of weapons.". The cannon that was captured is on display at the museum on the property of the Ford Mansion, along with other field guns of the era.

== Resistance of 1779–1780 ==
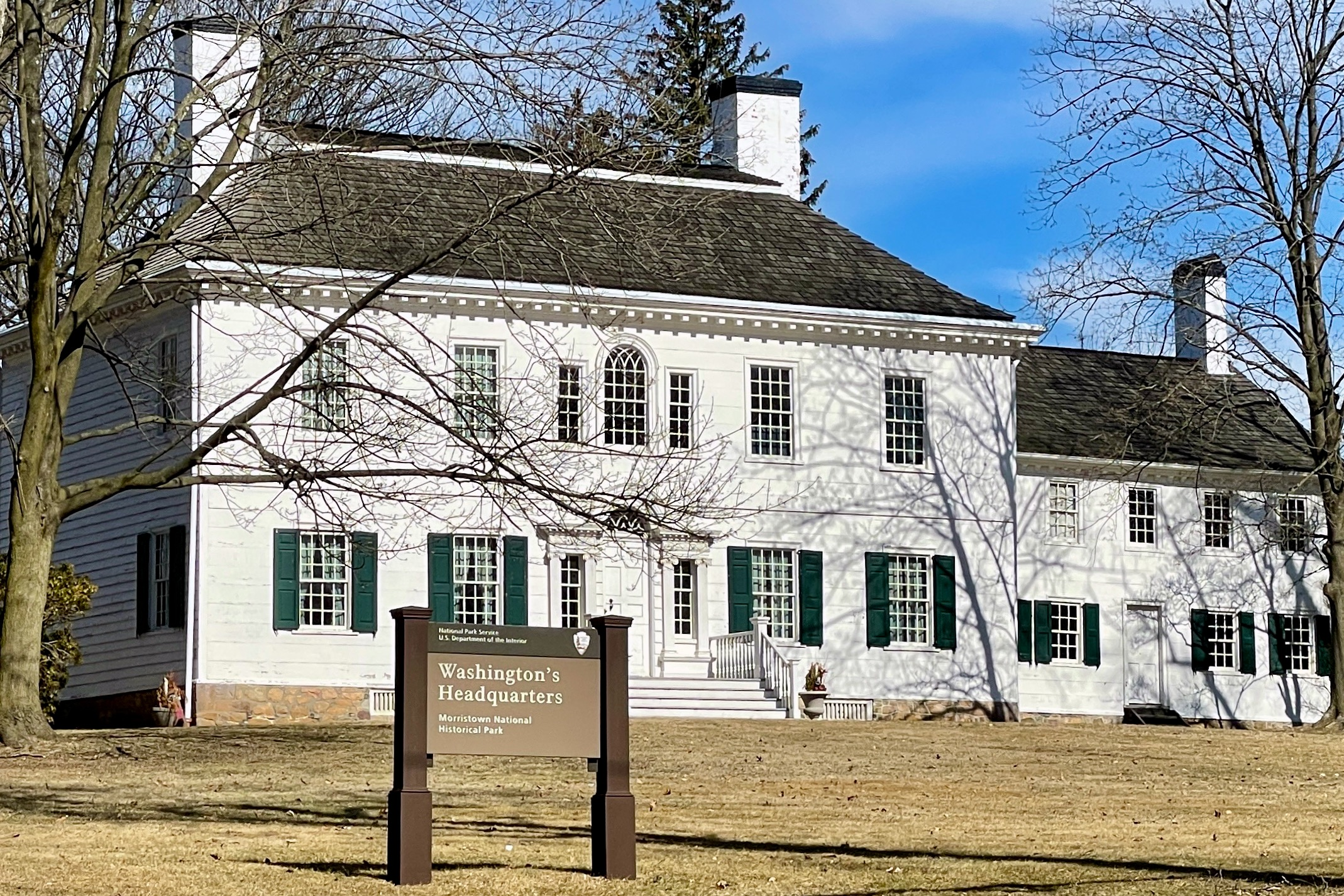
The home of Theodosia Ford in Morristown, New Jersey, the military headquarters for George Washington and the Continental Army during the winter of 1779-1780

After Ford's death, Mrs. Theodosia Ford gained ownership of the mansion. According to Pfister, "Mrs. Ford held the family together and kept the farm and family business a profitable endeavor".

Prior to Washington's arrival, the house was considered a "great human tragedy for the Ford family" because it was rented in 1777 to Continental Army troops that developed smallpox. When Washington arrived, he asked permission from the widow if he could stay in the mansion and paid her rent. General Washington, Martha Washington, five aides-de-camp, and 18 servants stayed in the mansion.

Mrs. Ford and her four children occupied two of the four downstairs bedrooms and reserved the kitchen for her own personal use.

== Commander-in-Chief ==
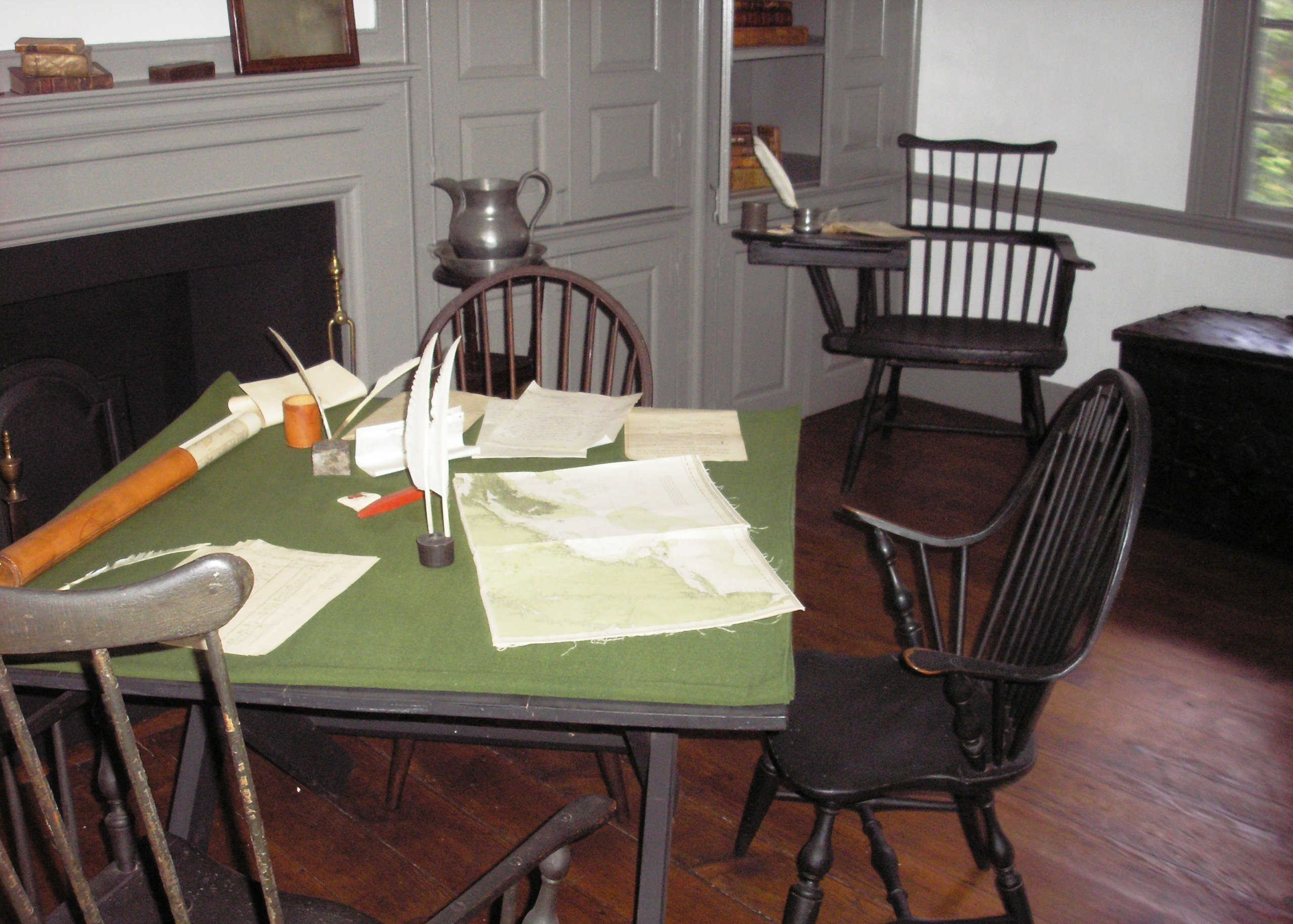
The study used by George Washington during his stay at the mansion

Washington arrived at Ford mansion in December 1779. The location was perfect for him because the American capital was in Philadelphia and the British Army capital was in Manhattan. It allowed Washington to keep a close eye on the British and enabled him to send letters successfully to the Continental Congress.

Washington wrote many letters to Congress explaining the poor predicament that his troops were in during his stay at the Ford Mansion. His place of work was in the private study, which was located on the first floor of the house. Washington's aides-de-camp worked in the parlor, which became the military office. These included Alexander Hamilton, Robert H. Harrison, Tench Tilghman, Richard K. Meade, and James McHenry. The only record of Washington's stay at the mansion was a letter from Meade to Mrs. Ford, dated July 26, 1780:

Madam: I have received your favour by Captain Tomas Pry. I communicated its contents to His Excellency and am directed to transmit you the inclosed certificate. I have the honour and I certify that the commander in Chief took up his quarters at Mrs. Fords at Morris Town the first day of December 1779, that he left them the 23d of June 1780, and that he occupied two rooms below; all the upper floor, Kitchen, Cellar and Stable. The Stable was built and the two Rooms above Stairs finished at the public expence, and a well, which was intirely useless and filled up before, put in thorough repair by walling & c. Head Quarters near Passaick July 26th. 1780.

== Preservation ==
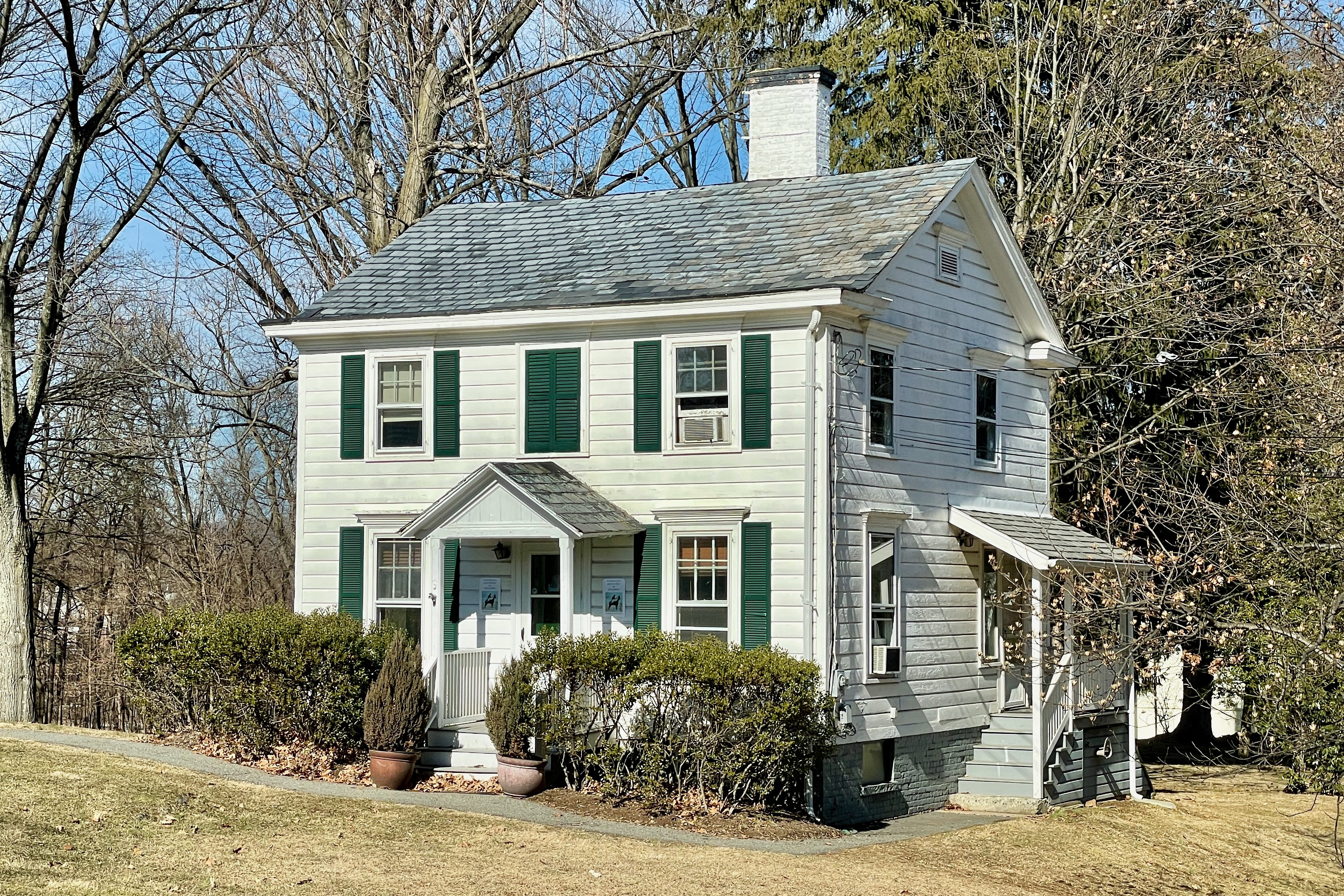
Ford Mansion's caretaker cottage

The Washington Association of New Jersey was founded to preserve the Ford Mansion and its history in Morristown. It purchased the mansion in 1873 and began restoration. A caretaker's cottage was built nearby in 1886. The mansion and grounds were transferred to the National Park Service in 1933.

== See also ==
- New Jersey in the American Revolution
- List of Washington's Headquarters during the Revolutionary War
- List of museums in New Jersey
- List of the oldest buildings in New Jersey
- List of historic sites preserved along Rochambeau's route

== Bibliography ==
- Fleming, Thomas. The Forgotten Victory: The Battle For New Jersey – 1780. New York: Reader's Digest Press.
- Gowans, Alan (1964). Architecture in New Jersey: A Record of American Civilization. New Jersey: D. Van Nostrand Company Inc.
- Meade, Richard K. Richard K. Meade to Theodosia Ford Morristown, July 26, 1780, In George Washington Papers at the Library of Congress, 1741–1799, ed. John C. Fitzpatrick (1745–1799).
- Pfister, Jude M. (2009) The Jacob Ford Jr. Mansion. Charleston, South Carolina: The History Press.
- Reidy, Joseph (2008). Washington Headquarters PowerPoint. Morristown, New Jersey: Morristown National Historical Park.
- Szuter, Bob (2009). Morristown: Where American Survived (DVD). Narrated by Edward Herman. Morristown, New Jersey: New Jersey Network.
- Bartenstein, Fred and Isabel (1975). "New Jersey's Revolutionary War Powder Mill". Morris County Historical Society.
