= Hobart Gap =

Mountain pass in New Jersey, USA

Coordinates: 40°43′N 74°19′W

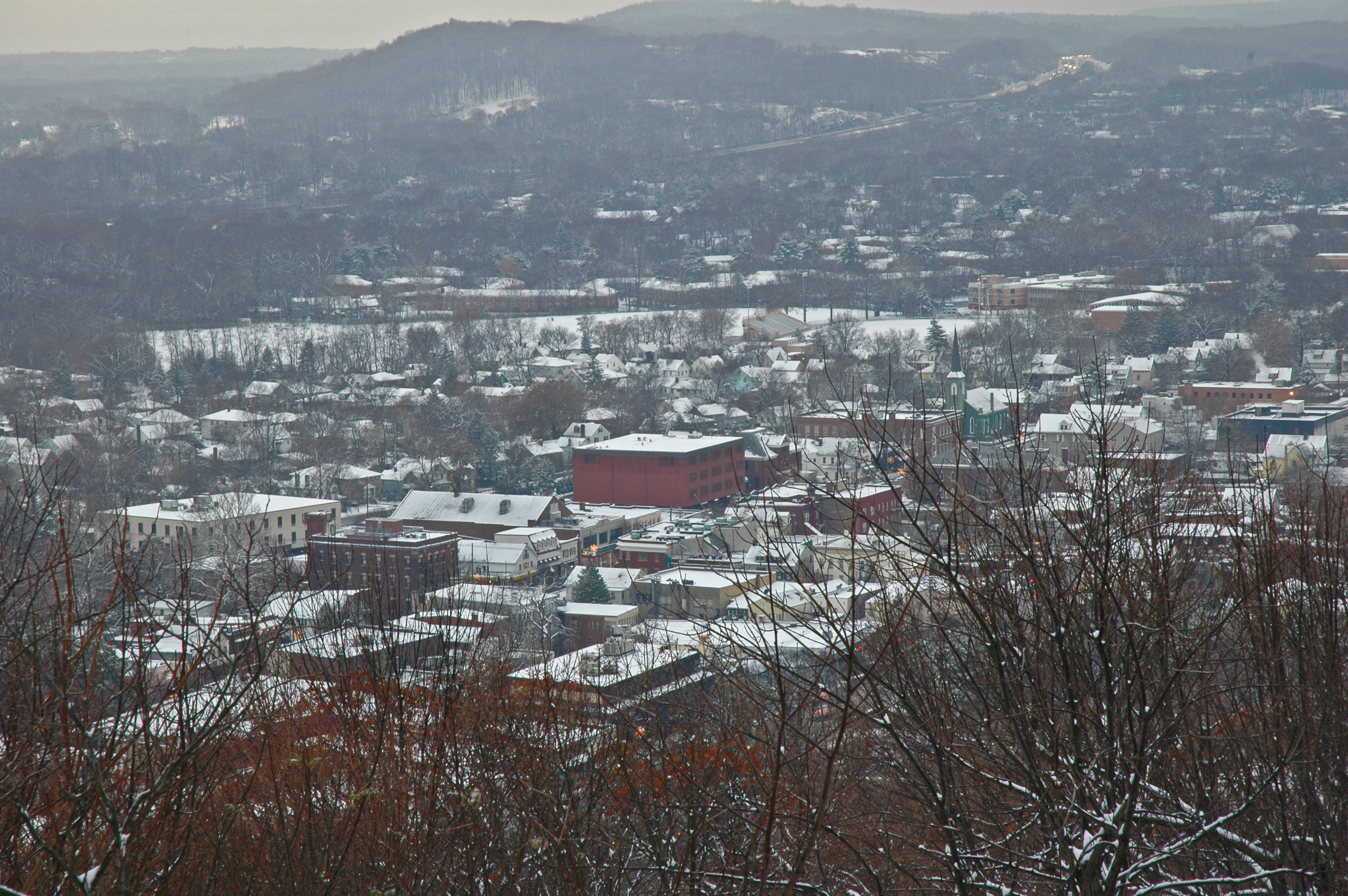
The Hobart Gap (Millburn, New Jersey) seen from South Mountain Reservation.

The Hobart Gap is a pass and road through the Watchung Mountains in Northern New Jersey. During the American Revolutionary War, Hessian General Baron Wilhelm von Knyphausen attempted to seize the Hobart Gap, now crossed by present-day Route 24, in order to attack the American headquarters in Morristown for the British. He was met with successful resistance by General Nathanael Greene, and was eventually defeated by the Continental Army and the New Jersey Militia at the Battle of Springfield.

For thousands of years the pass in the mountain range was an important aspect of the traditional Lenape Minisink Trail. From the pass, the trail led to a landing at the best place to ford what the Native Americans called the Fishawack (the Passaic River). The trail was a portion of the Great Trail and always had been used by the Lenape on their route to the Hudson River and south from their hunting grounds in what is now Sussex County. That traditional part of the Great Trail would become Route 24, and leads from the pass through Chatham, Madison, Morristown, Mendham, and Chester; it is called Main Street in all but Morristown, the county seat, which is dominated by a square in the center of its downtown. Route 24 was recently redirected around the old road in order to retain the historical downtowns of the colonial villages through which the trail led. The portion of the original path is now labeled Route 124.
