= Morristown National Historical Park =

National Historical Park of the United States

- U.S. National Register of Historic Places
- U.S. National Historical Park
- New Jersey Register of Historic Places
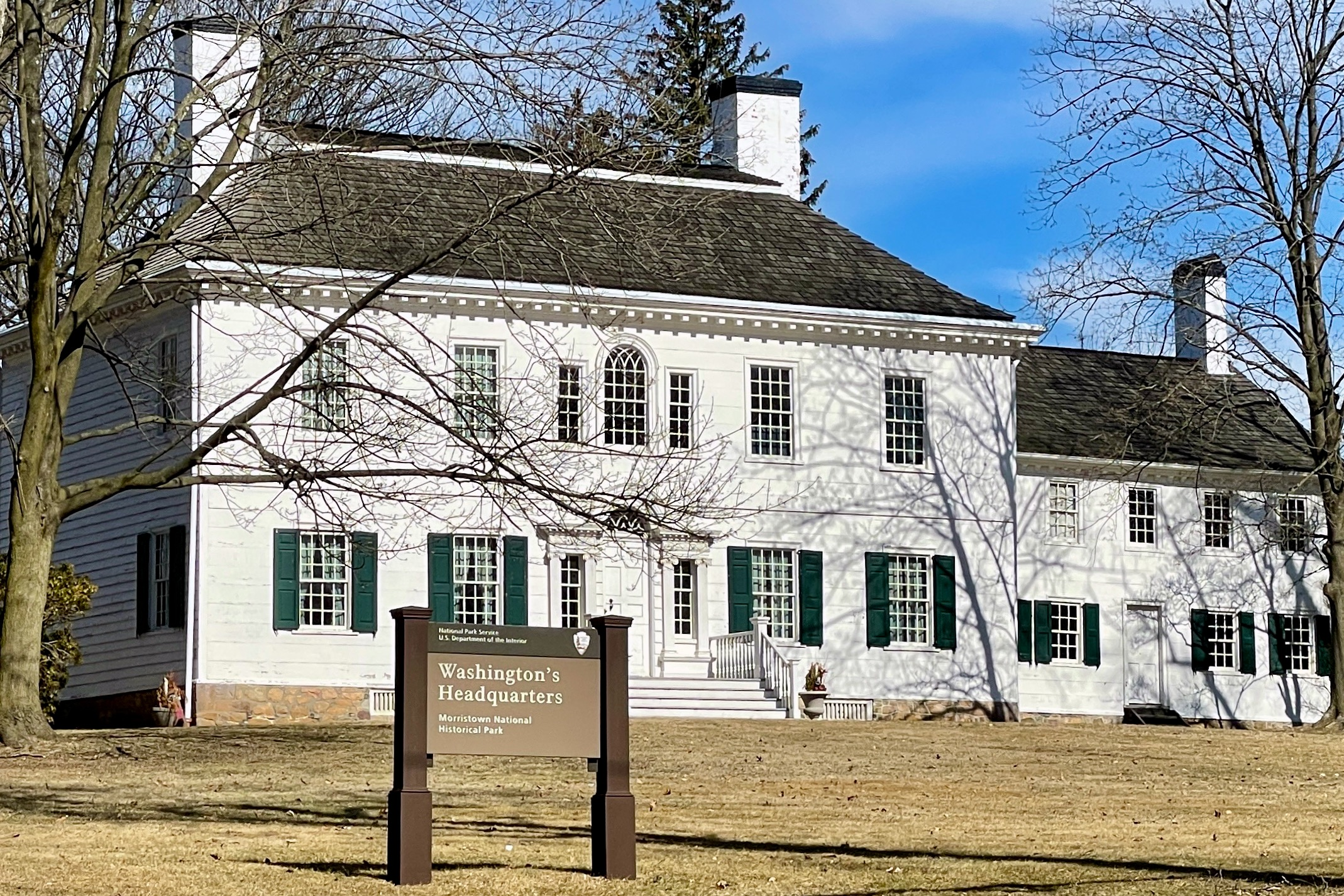
- Ford Mansion, Washington's headquarters in Morristown, New Jersey

- Location within Morris County, New Jersey Location within New Jersey Location within the United States
- Location: In and around Morristown, New Jersey
- Coordinates: 40°47′47″N 74°28′0″W
- Area: 1,711 acres (6.92 km^{2})
- Built: 1744
- Architectural style: Georgian, Cape Cod
- Visitation: 183,001 (2025)
- NRHP reference No.: 66000053
- NJRHP No.: 3381

Significant dates
- Added to NRHP: October 15, 1966
- Designated NHP: March 2, 1933
- Designated NJRHP: May 27, 1971

Morristown National Historical Park is a United States National Historical Park, headquartered in Morristown, New Jersey, consisting of four sites important during the American Revolutionary War: Jockey Hollow, Ford Mansion, Fort Nonsense, and Washington's Headquarters Museum.

The sites are located in Morristown and Harding Township, both in Morris County, and in Bernardsville in Somerset County.

With its establishment on March 2, 1933, Morristown became the country's first National Historical Park. On October 15, 1966, citing its significance in archeology, architecture, and military history, it was added to the National Register of Historic Places.

== Sites Conference ==
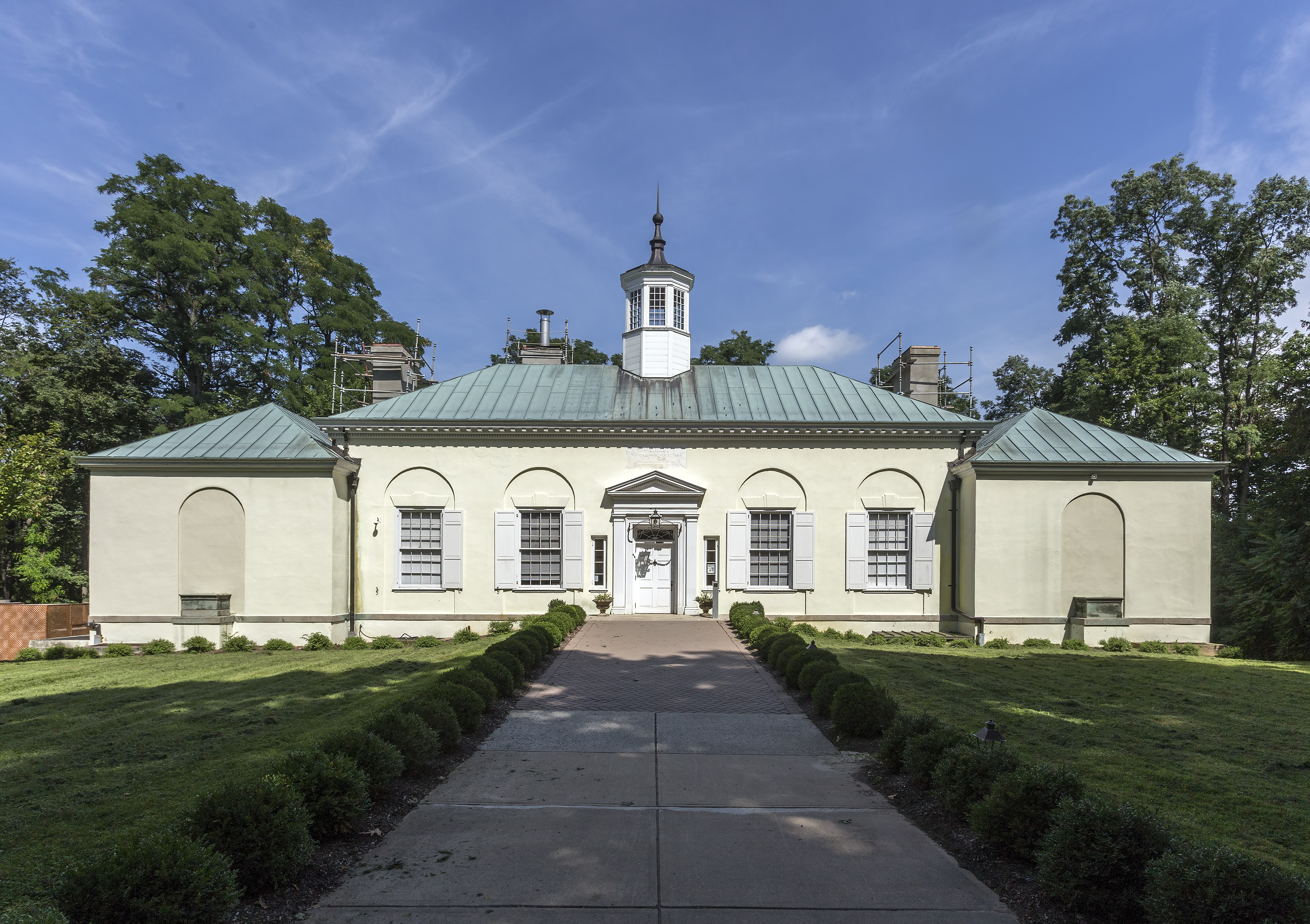
Washington's Headquarters Museum

Jockey Hollow, a few miles south of Morristown, New Jersey along Route 202 in Harding Township, was the site of a Continental Army encampment. It was from here that the entire Pennsylvania contingent mutinied and later, 200 New Jersey soldiers attempted to emulate them.

Fort Nonsense occupied a high hilltop overlooking Morristown, and is believed to have been the site of a signal fire and earthworks.

Ford Mansion in Morristown was the site of the "hard winter" (December 1779 – May 1780) quarters of George Washington and the Continental Army. That winter remains the coldest on record for New Jersey. Theodosia Ford, widow of Jacob Ford Jr., and her four children shared their household with Washington, his staff, including Alexander Hamilton, their servants and sometimes their family members. Martha Washington traveled from Mount Vernon to Morristown to spend the winter with her husband.

Washington's Headquarters Museum, the adjacent museum is open to the public Wednesday thru Sunday from September–June and seven days a week from July- August from 9:30 AM to 5:00 PM. The museum has three exhibit rooms and a sales area. A video production, Morristown: Where America Survived (New Jersey Network, 2009) is shown. The Ford Mansion is shown only by guided tour, which begins in the museum.

The New Jersey Brigade Encampment Site is located south of Jockey Hollow in Bernardsville in Somerset County. It was the encampment for approximately 1,300 Continental Army soldiers over the 1779-1780 winter.

== Park history ==
In April 1932, the National Park Service (NPS) published a report recommending that the site of the Continental Army's winter encampments in 1776-77 and 1779-80 become a Federal Historical Reserve; the report recommended including two sites, Jockey Hollow and the Ford Mansion.

In January 1933, a conference including NPS representatives, the U.S. Secretary of the Interior, and civic and business leaders from the Morris County area, drafted a bill supporting the creation of a national historical park, with "the rank and dignity equal to the scenic program in the West."

The bill for creating the Morristown National Historical Park was submitted to Congress in mid-January (H.R. 14302; S. 5469) and was supported by U.S. Secretary of the Interior Ray Lyman Wilbur, who called it "the most important park project before this department at the present time."

In March 1933, in the last days of Herbert Hoover's presidency, the 72nd Congress established Morristown as the country's first National Historical Park.

== See also ==
- National Register of Historic Places listings in Morris County, New Jersey
