= 1779 New Jersey gubernatorial election =

- October 30, 1779
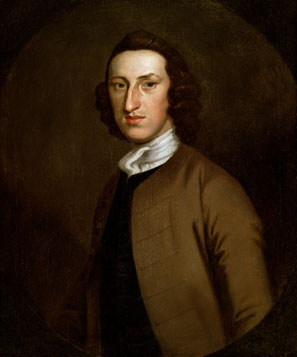

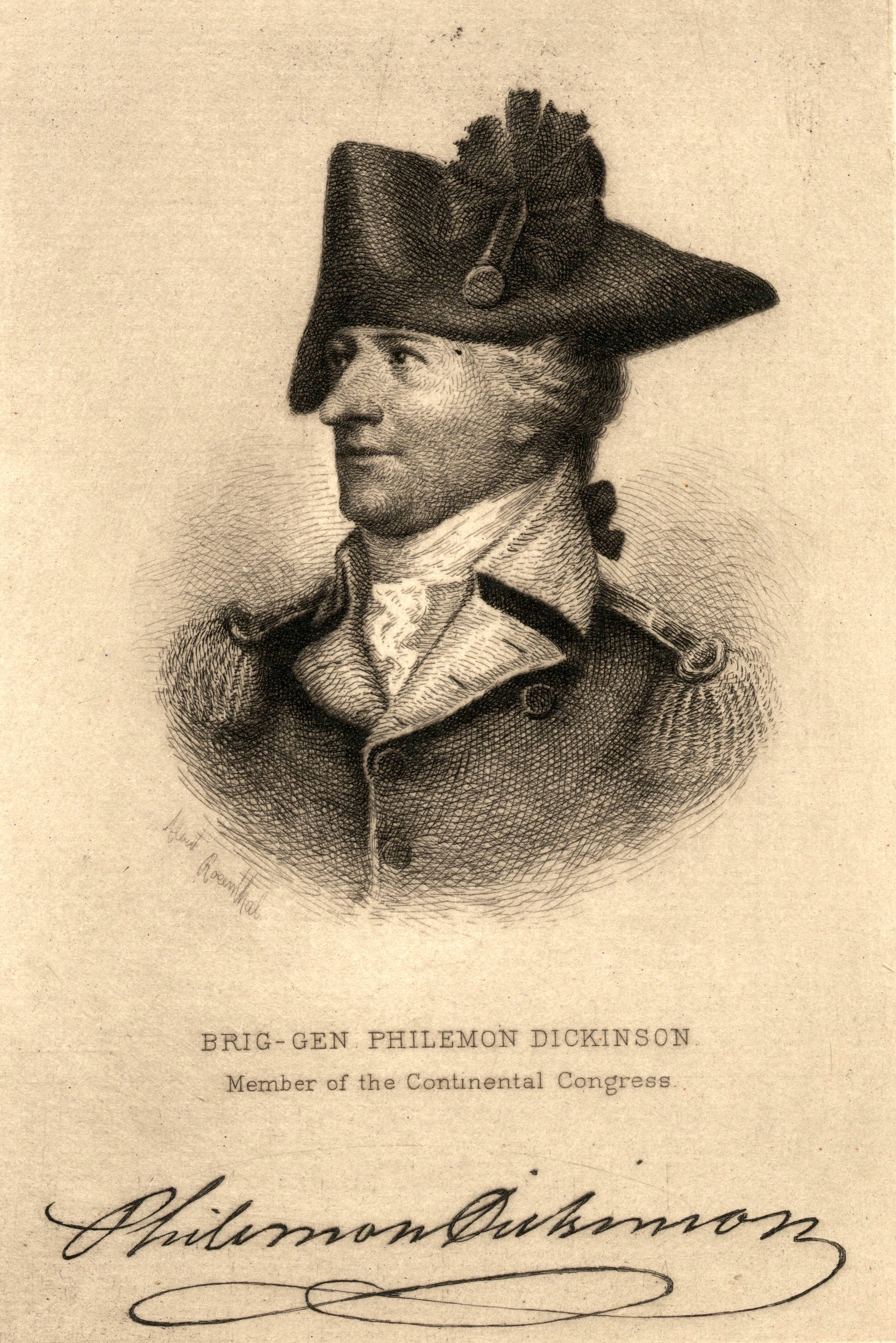
Nominee	William Livingston	Philemon Dickinson
Party	Nonpartisan	Nonpartisan
Popular vote	29	9
Percentage	76.32%	23.68%
Governor before election
William Livingston
Nonpartisan
Elected Governor
William Livingston
Nonpartisan

The 1779 New Jersey gubernatorial election was held on October 30, 1779, in order to elect the Governor of New Jersey. Incumbent Governor William Livingston was re-elected by the New Jersey General Assembly against his opponent candidate Philemon Dickinson in a rematch of the previous election.

== General election ==
On election day, October 30, 1779, incumbent Governor William Livingston was re-elected by the New Jersey General Assembly by a margin of 20 votes against his opponent candidate Philemon Dickinson. Livingston was sworn in for his fourth term on November 2, 1779.

=== Results ===
New Jersey gubernatorial election, 1779
Party	Candidate	Votes	%
Nonpartisan	William Livingston (incumbent)	29	76.32%
Nonpartisan	Philemon Dickinson	9	23.68%
Total votes		38	100.00%
Nonpartisan hold			
