= New York and New Jersey campaign =

Campaign in the American Revolutionary War

- Part of the American Revolutionary War
- Map of the American Revolutionary War's New York and New Jersey campaign
Date	July 1776 – March 1777
Location	New York and New Jersey
Result	New York: British victory: British control of New York City for the rest of the war until the final British evacuation in 1783; The city's strategic port and harbor remain in British hands; Constant military activity in the surrounding area for the remainder of the war; New York City becomes a haven for Loyalists fleeing other areas of the country and resulting in severe overcrowding, that is until November 25, 1783, when the last Loyalists left after the Treaty of Paris; Thousands of Americans are taken prisoner and die in captivity; New Jersey: U.S. victory: U.S. retains control of New Jersey; Continental Army preserved; Continental Army adopts a Fabian strategy; Development of American military intelligence and espionage

Belligerents
United States	Great Britain: Loyalists; Hesse; Waldeck

Commanders and leaders
George Washington; Charles Lee (surrendered); John Sullivan; Hugh Mercer †	William Howe; Henry Clinton; Charles Cornwallis; Richard Howe; Wilhelm von Knyphausen; Carl von Donop; Johann Rall †

Strength
23,000 soldiers and militia	32,000 soldiers

Casualties and losses
~1,052 killed 1,226 wounded 4,237 missing or captured (Note: 300 killed in action and around 500 prisoners died of wounds, starvation, and smallpox as well as 800 wounded and 1,079 captured or missing during the Battle of Long Island, 50 killed and 320 captured during the Landing at Kip's Bay, 30 killed and 100 wounded during the Battle of Harlem Heights, 8 killed and 13 wounded during the Battle of Pell's Point, 3 killed and 12 wounded during the Battle of Mamaroneck, around 50 killed, 150 wounded, and 1 missing during the Battle of White Plains, 59 killed, 96 wounded, and 2,837 captured during the Battle of Fort Washington, 2 dead from exposure and 5 wounded during the Battle of Trenton, 6 killed, 10 wounded, and 1 deserted during the Battle of the Assunpink Creek, and 44 killed and 40 wounded during the Battle of Princeton. Unknown during the Battle of Iron Works Hill and the Battle of Millstone.)	3,000 killed & wounded 1,400 captured

The New York and New Jersey campaign in 1776 and the winter months of 1777 was a series of American Revolutionary War battles for control of the Port of New York and the state of New Jersey, fought between British forces under General Sir William Howe and the Continental Army under General George Washington. Howe was successful in driving Washington out of New York, but overextended his reach into New Jersey, and ended the New York and New Jersey campaign in January 1777 with only a few outposts near New York City under British control. The British held New York Harbor for the rest of the Revolutionary War, using it as a base for expeditions against other targets.

Landing unopposed on Staten Island on July 3, 1776, Howe had assembled an army that included components that the Royal Navy had evacuated from Boston on March 17 following the British failure to hold that city, combined with additional British troops, and Hessian troops hired from several German principalities. Washington's Continental Army included soldiers and regiments from ten of the Thirteen Colonies, those as far south as the Colony of Virginia. Landing on Long Island in August, Howe defeated Washington in the largest battle of the war in North America, but the Continental Army was able to regroup and make an orderly and covert retreat to Manhattan that night under a cover of darkness and fog. Washington suffered a series of further defeats in Manhattan but prevailed in a skirmish at the Battle of Harlem Heights and eventually withdrew his troops successfully to White Plains, New York. Howe, meanwhile, returned to Manhattan and captured those forces Washington had left on the island.

Washington and much of his army crossed the Hudson River to Rockland County and then south into New Jersey, retreated across the state, and then crossed the Delaware River into Pennsylvania. Along the way, his army shrank due to the ending of enlistment periods, desertions, and poor morale. Howe ordered his troops into winter quarters in December, establishing a chain of outposts from New York City to Burlington, New Jersey. Washington, in a tremendous boost to American morale, launched a successful strike against the Trenton garrison on the morning of December 26, 1776, prompting Howe to withdraw his chain of outposts back to New Brunswick and the coast near New York. Washington, in turn, established his winter camp at Morristown. During the following winter months and through the rest of the war, both sides skirmished frequently around New York City and New Jersey as the British sought forage and provisions.

Britain maintained control of New York City and some of the surrounding territory until the war ended in 1783, using it as a base for operations elsewhere in North America. In 1777, General Howe launched a campaign to capture the revolutionary capital of Philadelphia, leaving General Sir Henry Clinton in command of the New York area, while General John Burgoyne led an attempt to gain control of the Hudson River valley, moving south from Quebec and being defeated at Saratoga.

== Background ==
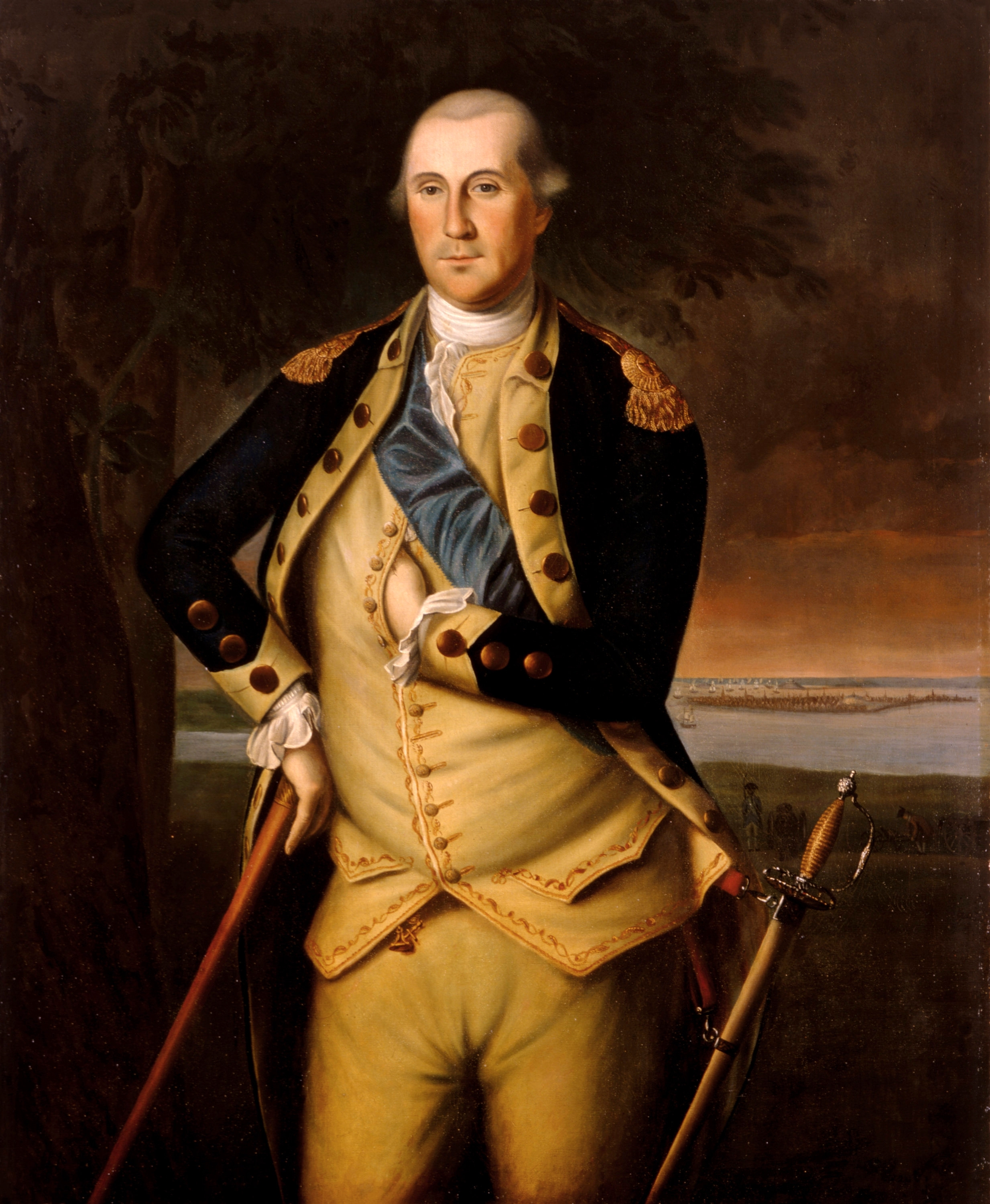
George Washington, a 1776 portrait by Charles Willson Peale

When the American Revolutionary War broke out in April 1775, British troops were under siege in Boston. They defeated Patriot forces in the Battle of Bunker Hill, suffering very high casualties. When news of this expensive British victory reached London, General William Howe and Lord George Germain, the British official responsible, determined that a "decisive action" should be taken against New York City using forces recruited from throughout the British Empire as well as troops hired from small German states.

Washington, who was named commander-in-chief of the Continental Army by the Second Continental Congress in Philadelphia, echoed the sentiments of other in the Congress that New York was "a post of infinite importance", and began the task of organizing military companies in the New York area when he stopped there on his way from Philadelphia to take command of the siege of Boston. In January 1776, Washington ordered Charles Lee to raise troops and take command of New York's defenses. Lee made some progress on the city's defenses when word arrived in late March that the British army had left Boston after Washington threatened them from heights south of the city. Concerned that General Howe was sailing directly to New York, Washington hurried regiments from Boston, including General Israel Putnam, who commanded the troops until Washington himself arrived in mid-April. At the end of April, Washington dispatched General John Sullivan with six regiments to the north to bolster the faltering Quebec campaign.

General Howe, rather than moving against New York, withdrew his army to Halifax in Nova Scotia, and regrouped while transports full of British troops, shipped from bases around Europe and intended for New York, began gathering at Halifax. In June, Howe set sail for New York with the 9,000 men assembled there, before all of the transports arrived. German troops, primarily from Hesse-Kassel, and British troops from Henry Clinton's ultimately unsuccessful expedition to the Carolinas, were supposed to meet with Howe's fleet when it reached New York. General Howe's brother, Admiral Lord Howe, arrived at Halifax with further transports after the general sailed, and immediately followed.

When General Howe arrived in the outer harbor of New York, the ships began sailing up the undefended Narrows between Staten Island and Long Island on July 2, and started landing troops on the undefended shores of Staten Island. Washington learned from prisoners taken that Howe had landed 10,000 men, but was awaiting the arrival of another 15,000. General Washington, with a smaller army of about 19,000 effective troops, lacked significant military intelligence on the British force and plans, and was uncertain exactly where in the New York area the Howes intended to strike. He consequently split the Continental Army between fortified positions on Long Island, Manhattan, and mainland locations, and also established a Flying Camp in northern New Jersey that was intended as a reserve force that could support operations anywhere along the New Jersey side of the Hudson River.

== Capture of New York City ==
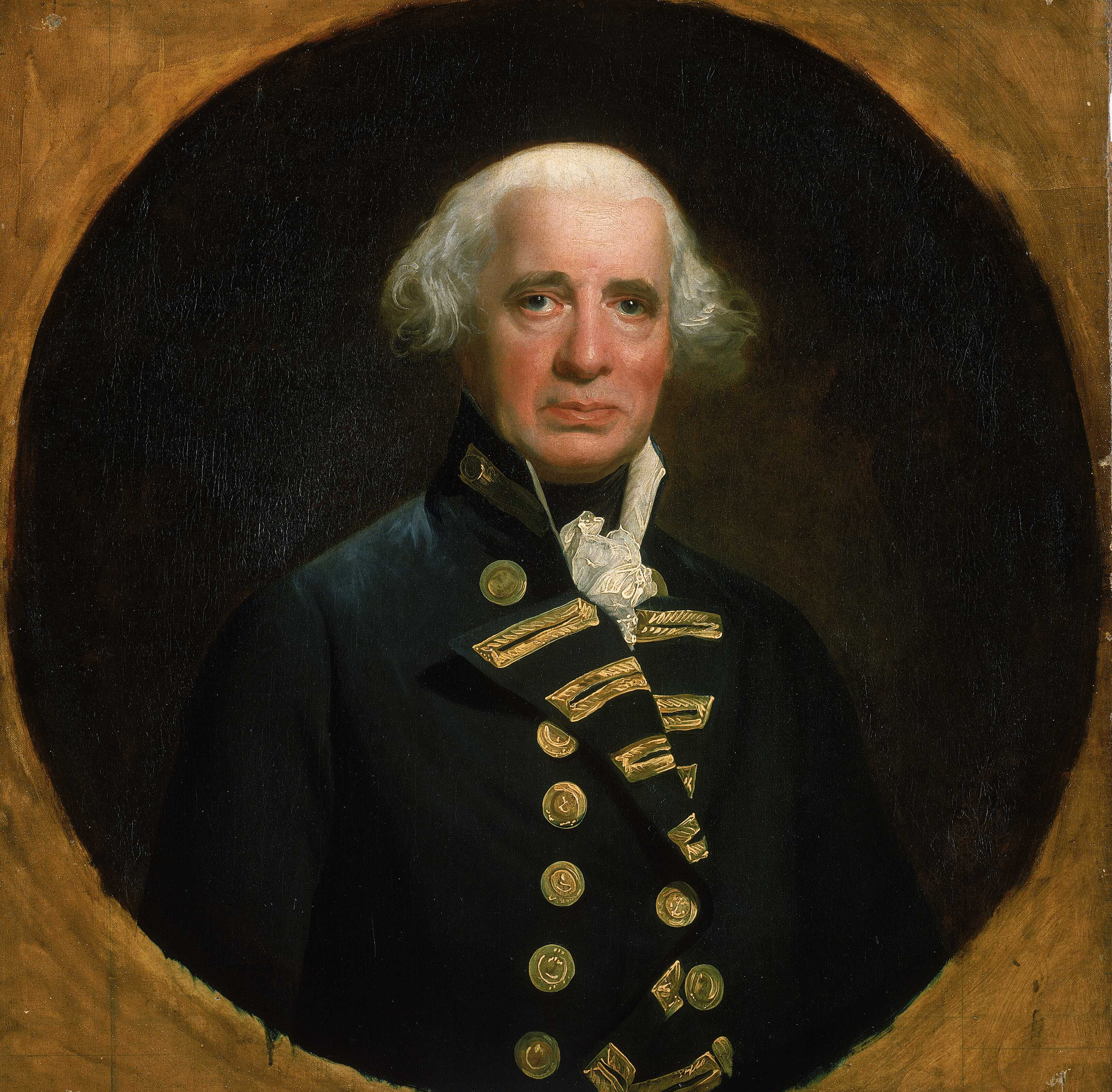
Portrait of Admiral Richard Howe by John Singleton Copley

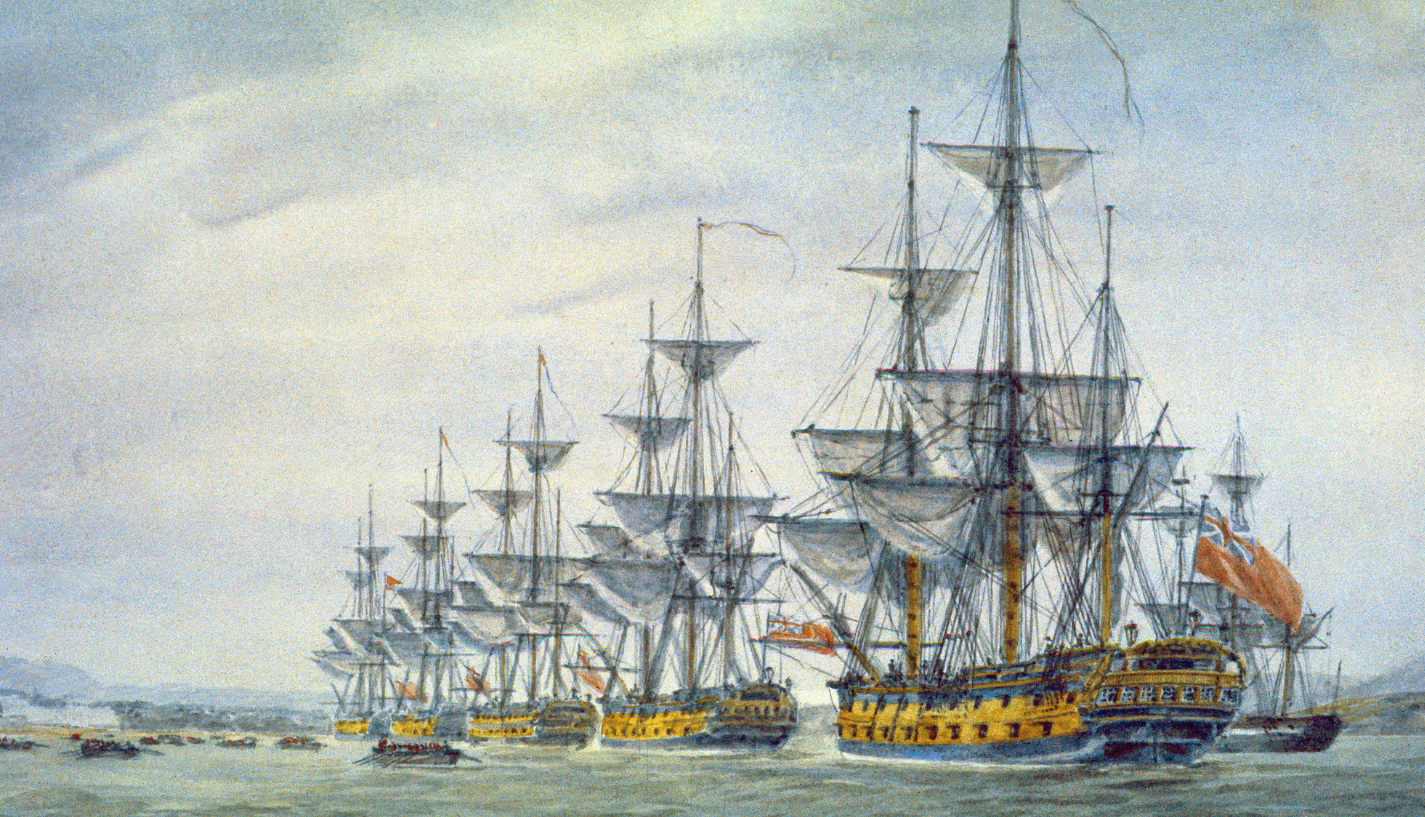
The British capture of Newport, Rhode Island on December 8, 1776

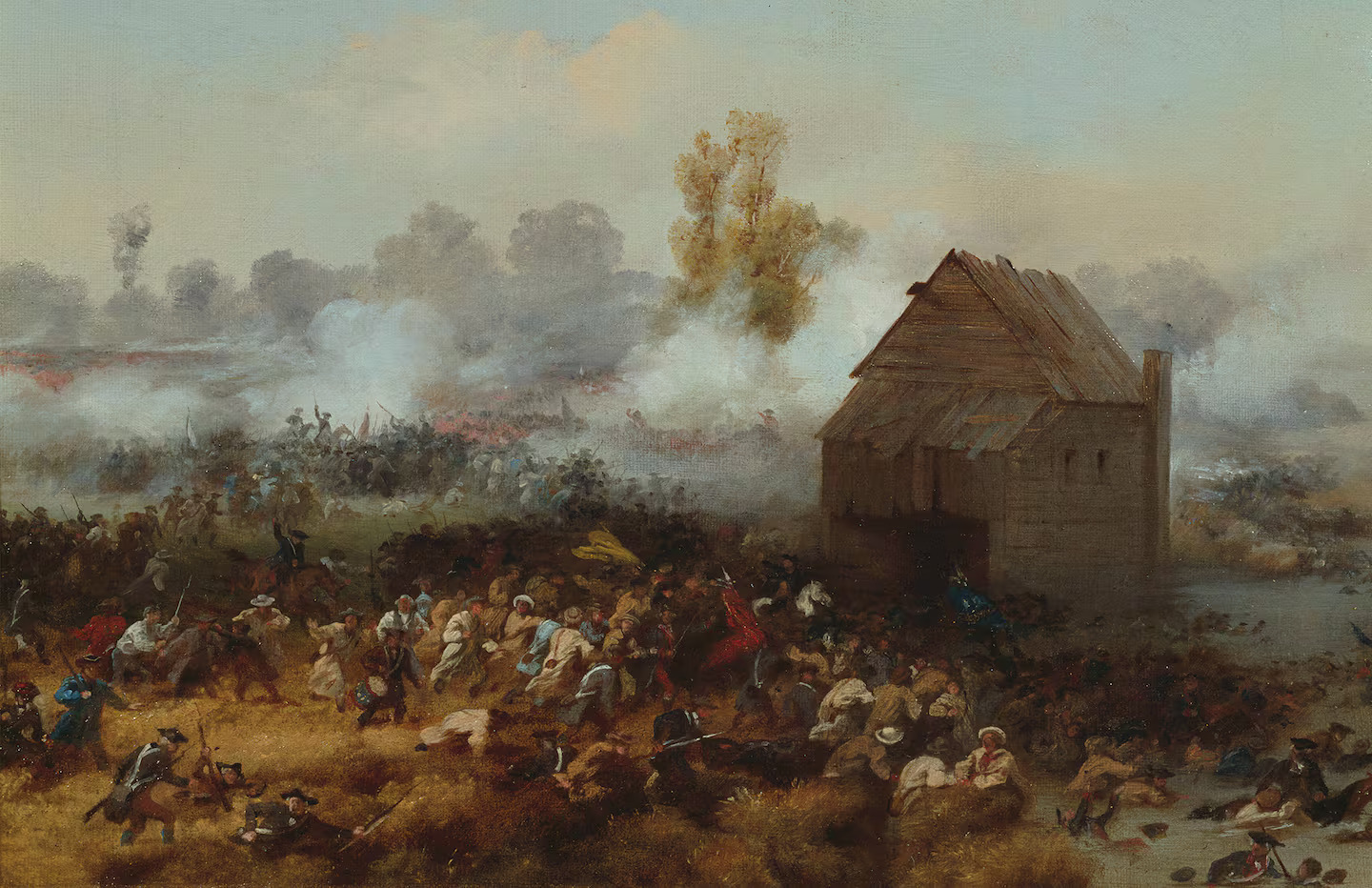
The Battle of Long Island, 1776, an 1858 portrait by Alonzo Chappel, featuring Lord Stirling in the background leading an attack against the British to enable the retreat of other troops in the foreground across a mill pond to Brooklyn Heights.

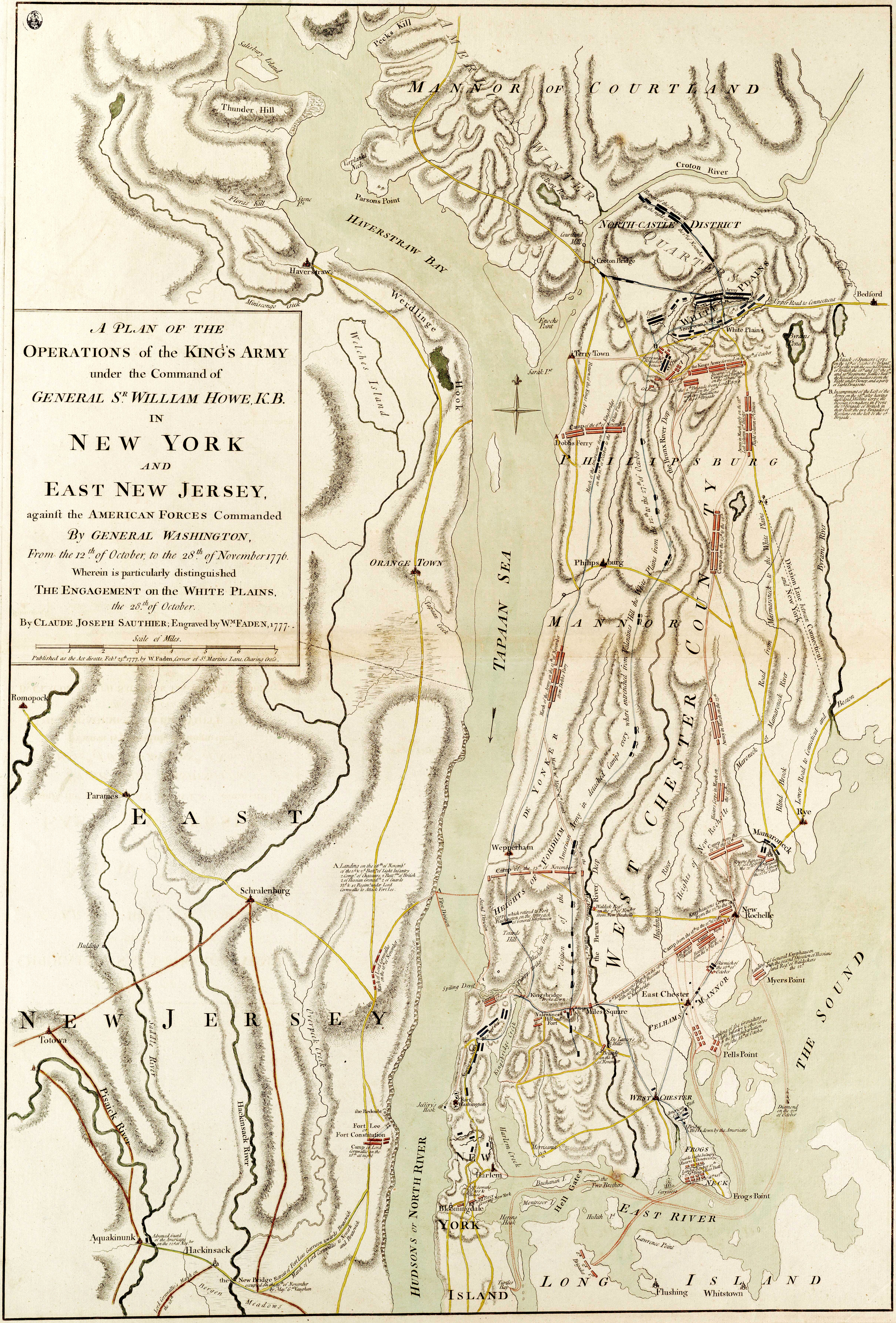
Military map by Claude Joseph Sauthier showing troop movements before, during, and after the Battle of White Plains

The Howe brothers had been granted authority as peace commissioners by the British Parliament with limited powers to pursue a peaceful resolution to the conflict. King George III was not optimistic about the possibility for peace, however, saying, "yet I think it right to be attempted, whilst every act of vigour is unremittingly carried on". Their powers were limited to granting of "general and special pardons" and to "confer with any of his Majesty's subjects". On July 14, pursuant to these powers, Admiral Howe sent a messenger with a letter addressed to "George Washington, Esq." across the harbor. Washington's adjutant, Joseph Reed, politely informed the messenger that no person with that title was in their army. Admiral Howe's aide wrote that "the Punctilio of an Address" should not have prevented the letter's delivery, and Howe was said to be visibly annoyed by the rejection. A second request, addressed to "George Washington, Esq., etc." was similarly rejected, although the messenger was told that Washington would receive one of Howe's adjutants. In that fruitless meeting, held July 20, Washington pointed out that the limited powers the Howe brothers had been given were not of much use, as the rebels had done no wrong requiring an amnesty.

In late August, the British transported about 22,000 men, including 9,000 Hessians, from Staten Island to Long Island. In the Battle of Long Island on August 27, the British outflanked the American positions, driving the Americans back to their Brooklyn Heights fortifications. General Howe then began to lay siege to the works, but Washington skillfully managed a nighttime retreat through his unguarded rear across the East River to the island of Manhattan. Howe then paused to consolidate his position and consider his next move.

During the Battle of Long Island, the British captured General John Sullivan. Admiral Howe convinced him to deliver a message to Congress in Philadelphia and released him on parole. Washington also gave his permission, and on September 2, Sullivan told the Congress that the Howes wanted to negotiate, and had been given much broader powers to treat than those they actually held. This created a diplomatic problem for Congress, which did not want to be seen as aggressive, which is how some representatives felt a direct rejection of the appeal would appear. Consequently, Congress agreed to send a committee to meet with the Howes in a move they did not think would bear any fruit. On September 11, the Howe brothers met with John Adams, Benjamin Franklin, and Edward Rutledge in the Staten Island Peace Conference. The positions expressed by the two groups in the three-hour meeting were irreconcilable.

Washington, who had previously been ordered by the Continental Congress to hold New York City, was concerned that he might have escaped one trap for another, since the army was still vulnerable to being surrounded on Manhattan. To keep his escape routes open to the north, he placed 5,000 troops in the city (which then only occupied the lower portion of Manhattan), and took the rest of the army to Harlem Heights. In the first recorded use of a submarine in warfare, he also attempted a novel attack on the Royal Navy, launching Turtle in a failed attempt to sink HMS Eagle, Admiral Howe's flagship.

On September 15, General Howe landed about 12,000 men on Lower Manhattan, quickly taking control of New York City. The Americans withdrew to Harlem, where they skirmished the next day, but held their ground. Rather than attempting to dislodge Washington from his strong position a second time, Howe again opted for a flanking maneuver. Landing troops with some opposition in October in Westchester County across the Harlem River and north of Manhattan, he sought once again to encircle Washington. To defend against this move, Washington withdrew most of his army to White Plains, where after a short battle on October 28, he retreated further north. The retreat of Washington's forces was aided by a dense fog that concealed their movement from the British troops. This isolated the remaining Continental Army troops in upper Manhattan, so Howe returned to Manhattan and captured Fort Washington in mid-November, taking almost 3,000 prisoners.

Four days later, on November 20, Fort Lee, across the Hudson River from Fort Washington, was also taken. Washington brought much of his army across the Hudson into New Jersey, but was immediately forced to retreat by the aggressive British advance.

General Howe, after consolidating British positions around New York harbor, detached 6,000 men under the command of two of his more difficult subordinates, Henry Clinton, and Hugh, Earl Percy to take Newport, Rhode Island and its strategic port east across Long Island Sound (which they did without opposition on December 8), while he sent General Lord Cornwallis to chase Washington's army through New Jersey. The Americans withdrew across the Delaware River into Pennsylvania in early December.

== Reactions ==
Washington's retreat across New Jersey

The outlook of the Continental Army—and thus the revolution itself—was bleak. "These are the times that try men's souls", wrote Thomas Paine in The American Crisis. Washington's army had dwindled to fewer than 5,000 men fit for duty and would be significantly reduced further after enlistments expired at the end of the year. Spirits were low, popular support was wavering, and Congress had abandoned Philadelphia, fearing a British attack. Washington ordered some of the troops that returned from the failed invasion of Quebec to join him, and also ordered General Lee's troops, which he had left north of New York City, to join him. Lee, whose relationship with Washington was at times difficult, made excuses and only traveled as far as Morristown, New Jersey. When Lee strayed too far from his army on December 12, his exposed position was betrayed by Loyalists, and a British company led by Lieutenant Colonel Banastre Tarleton surrounded the inn where he was staying and took him prisoner. Lee's command was taken over by John Sullivan, who finished marching the army to Washington's camp across the river from Trenton.

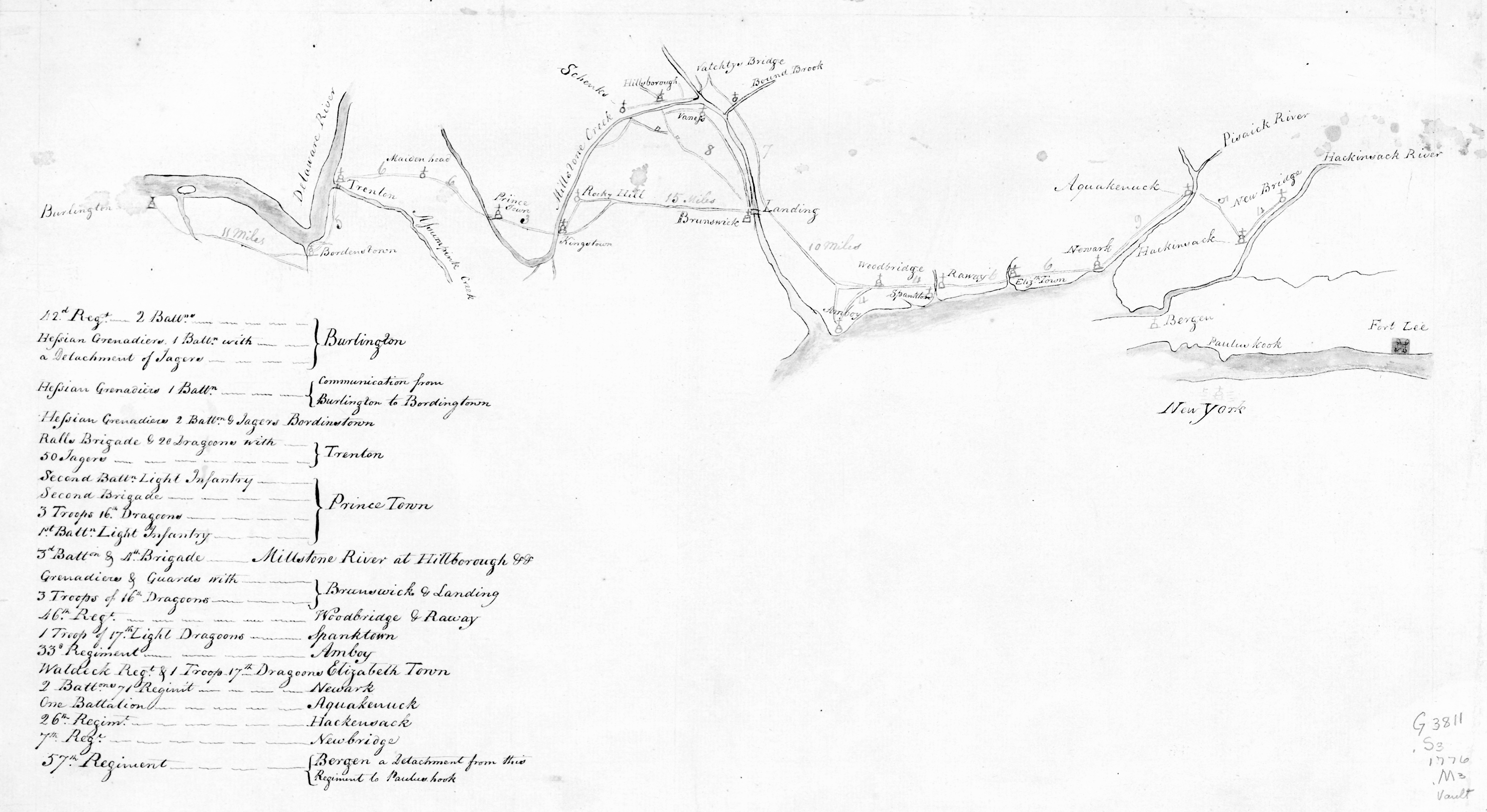
A hand-drawn period sketch depicting the locations of British outposts in New Jersey. Orientation is with north to the right.

The capture of Lee presented the Howes with a problematic prisoner. As with several other Continental Army leaders, he had previously served in the British Army. Because of this, the Howes at first treated him as a deserter, with threats of military punishment. However, Washington intervened, tying the treatment of Lee to the treatment of prisoners held by the Americans. Lee was ultimately treated well and apparently offered the British commanders advice on how to win the war. Because the Americans did not have a prisoner of comparable rank, Lee remained a prisoner in New York until 1778, when he was exchanged for Richard Prescott.

The failure of the Continental Army to hold New York also brought about a rise in Loyalist activity, as the city became a haven for refugee supporters of the Crown from elsewhere across the region. The British, therefore, actively recruited in New York and New Jersey to build regiments of provincial militia, with some success. Loyalists in these areas may have been motivated by seeing elements of the rebel army head home after their enlistments ended. One New York Patriot militia leader wrote that thirty of his men, rather than reenlisting with him, had instead signed up with the enemy. On November 30, Admiral Howe offered amnesty to anyone who had taken up arms against the Crown, provided they swore an oath to it. Washington responded with his own proclamation, suggesting that those who did not renounce such oaths should immediately go behind British lines. As a result, New Jersey became a civil battlefield, with militia activity as well as spying and counterspying continuing for the rest of the war.

News of the capture of New York was favorably received in London, and General Howe was awarded the Order of the Bath for his work. Combined with news of the recovery of Quebec, circumstances suggested to British leaders that the war could be ended with one more year's campaigning. News of Admiral Howe's amnesty proclamation was met with some surprise, as its terms were more lenient than the hardliners in the government expected. Politicians opposed to the war pointed out that the proclamation failed to mention the primacy of the Parliament. Furthermore, the Howes were criticized for failing to keep Parliament informed of the various peace efforts they embarked on.

== Howe's strategy ==
[Howe] shut his eyes, fought his battles, drank his bottle, had his little whore, advised with his counsellors, received his orders from North and Germain (one more absurd than the other).

— Charles Lee on General Howe

With the campaign at an apparent conclusion for the season, the British established a chain of outposts in New Jersey stretching from Perth Amboy to Bordentown, and entered winter quarters. They controlled New York harbor and much of New Jersey, and were in a good position to resume operations in the spring, with the rebel capital of Philadelphia in striking distance. Howe detached General Clinton with 6,000 additional men to occupy Newport as a base for future operations against Boston and Connecticut. Howe then sketched a campaign for the following year in a letter to Lord Germain: 10,000 men at Newport, 10,000 for an expedition to Albany (to meet an army descending from Quebec), 8,000 to cross New Jersey and threaten Philadelphia, and 5,000 to defend New York. If additional foreign forces were available, operations could also be considered against the southern states.

== Counterattack in New Jersey ==
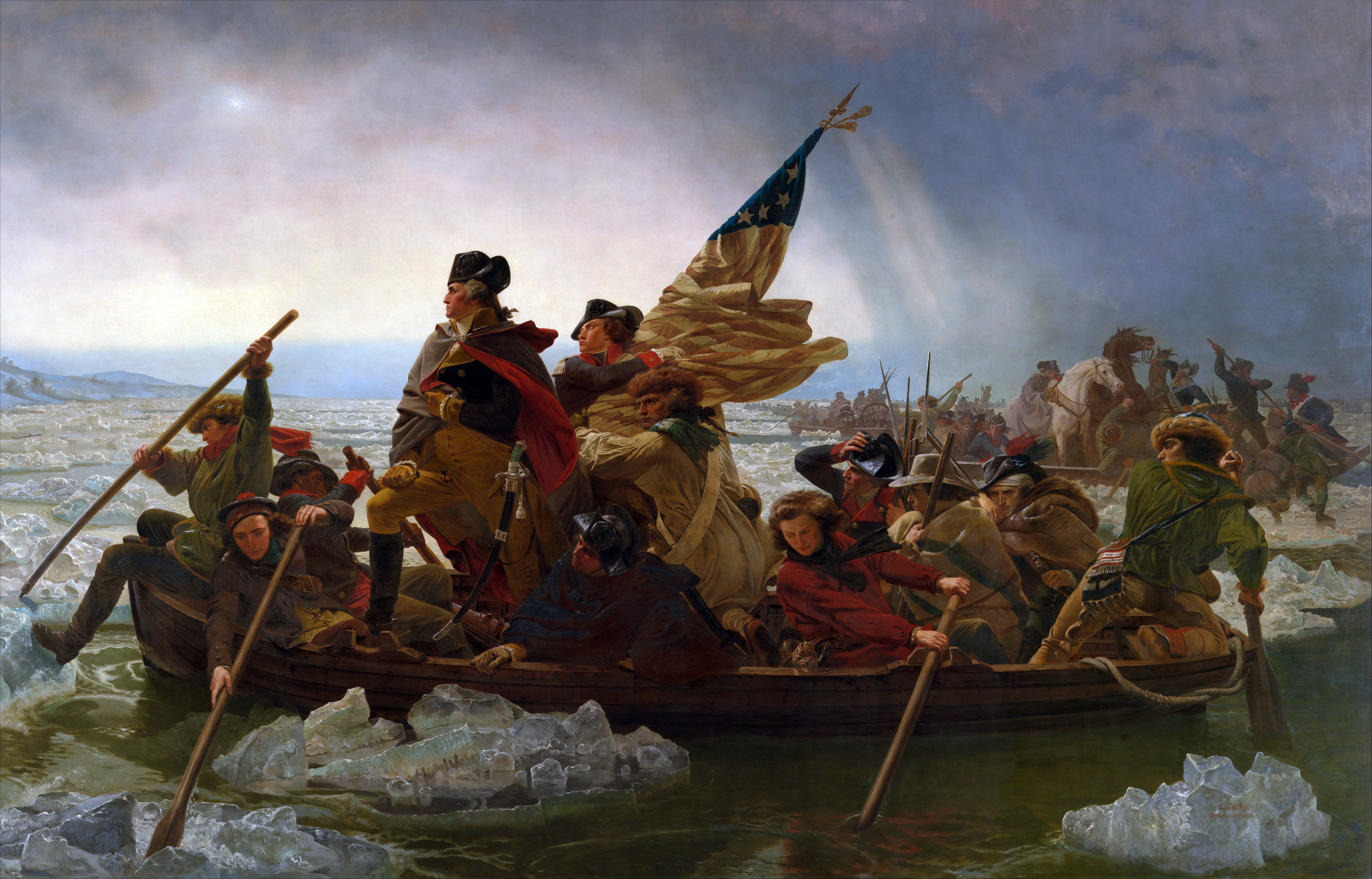
Emanuel Leutze's 1851 painting Washington Crossing the Delaware is an iconic image of American history.

While worrying over how to hold his army together, Washington organized attacks on the relatively exposed British outposts. German commanders Carl von Donop and Johann Rall, whose brigades were at the end of the chain of outposts, were frequent targets of these raids, but their repeated warnings and requests for support from General James Grant were dismissed.

Beginning in mid-December 1776, Washington planned a two-pronged attack on Rall's outpost in Trenton, with a third diversionary attack on Donop's outpost in Bordentown. The plan was aided by the fortuitous presence of a militia company that drew Donop's entire 2,000-man force away from Bordentown to the south that resulting in a skirmish at Mount Holly on December 23. The consequence of this action was that Donop was not in a position to assist Rall when Washington's attack on Trenton took place. Washington and 2,400 men stealthily crossed the Delaware River and surprised Rall's outpost on the morning of December 26 in a street-to-street battle, killing or capturing nearly 1,000 Hessians. This action not only significantly boosted the army's morale; it also brought Cornwallis out of New York. He reassembled an army of more than 6,000 men and marched most of them against a position Washington had taken south of Trenton. Leaving a garrison of 1,200 at Princeton, Cornwallis then attacked Washington's position on January 2, 1777, and was three times repulsed before darkness set in. During the night Washington once again stealthily moved his army, going around that of Cornwallis with the intention of attacking the Princeton garrison.

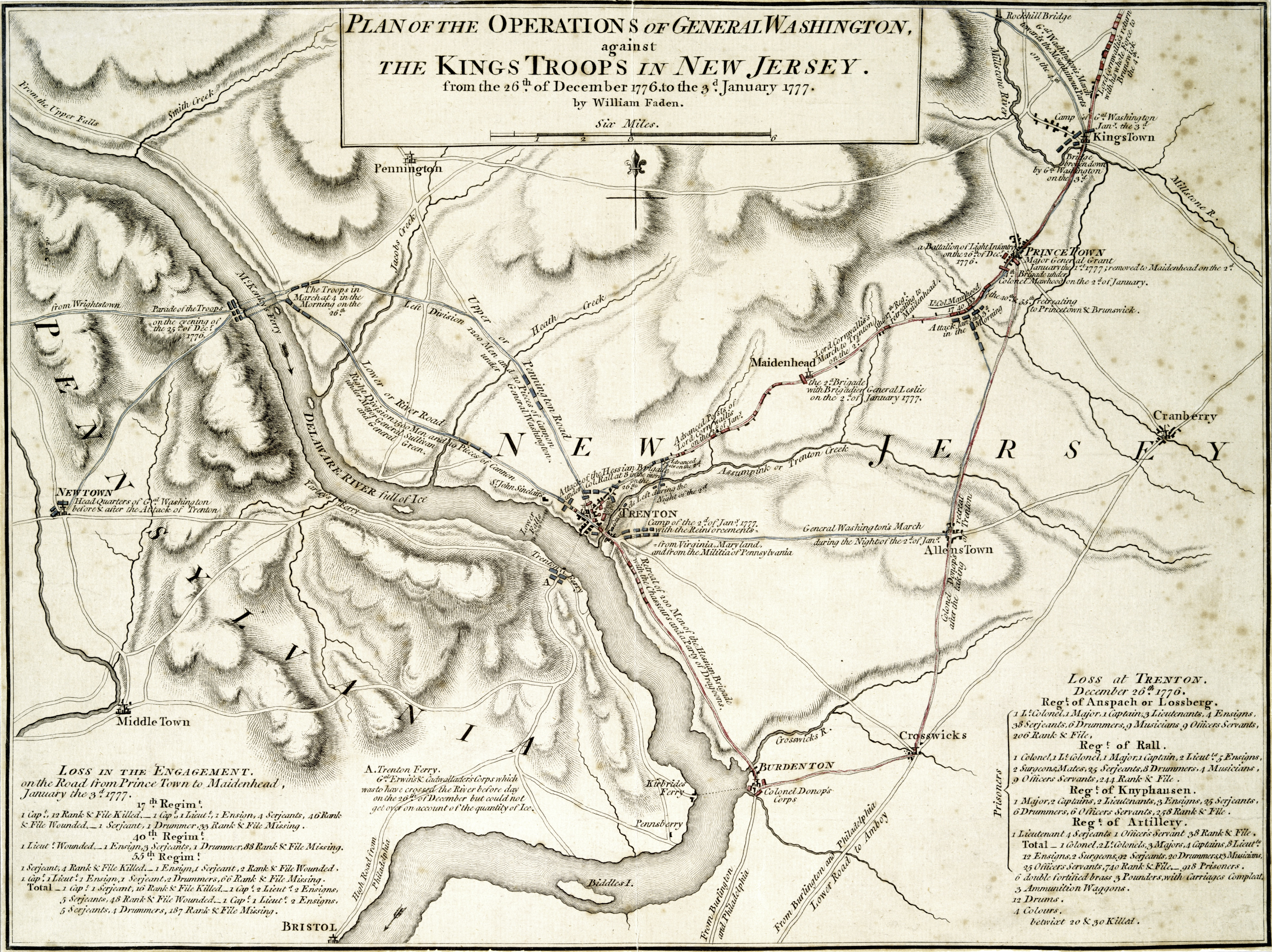
Military map by William Faden with troop movements during the Ten Crucial Days

On January 3, Hugh Mercer, leading the American advance guard, encountered British soldiers from Princeton under the command of Charles Mawhood. The British troops engaged Mercer and in the ensuing battle, Mercer was mortally wounded. Washington sent reinforcements under General John Cadwalader, which were successful in driving Mawhood and the British from Princeton, with many of them fleeing to Cornwallis in Trenton. The British lost more than one quarter of their force in the battle, and American morale further rose with the victory. This period, from December 25, 1776, through January 3, 1777, has become known as the Ten Crucial Days.

The defeats convinced General Howe to withdraw most of his army from New Jersey, only leaving outposts at New Brunswick and Perth Amboy. Washington entered winter quarters at Morristown, having retaken most of the state from the British. However, provisions for both armies were limited, and commanders on both sides sent out parties to forage for food and other supplies. For the next few months, they engaged in a forage war, in which each targeted the foraging parties of the other. This led to numerous skirmishes and minor confrontations, including the Battle of Millstone. The British also sniped with each other over the subject of provisions. Lord Percy resigned his command after a series of disagreements with Howe came to a head over the ability of the Newport station to provide forage to the New York and New Jersey forces.

== Aftermath ==
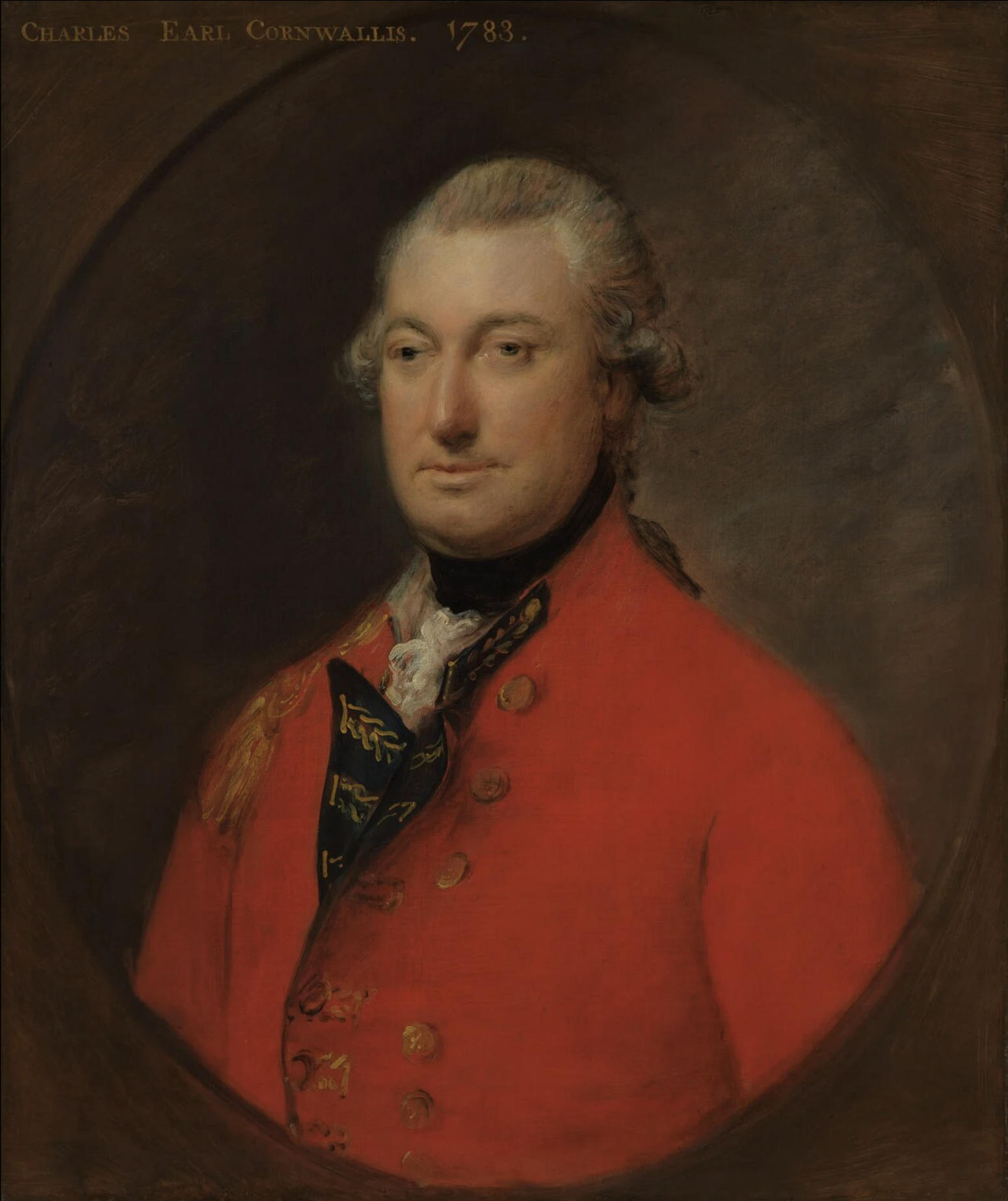
General Charles Cornwallis, 1st Marquess Cornwallis, 1783 portrait by Thomas Gainsborough

The British gained control of New York Harbor and the surrounding agricultural areas, and held New York City and Long Island until the war ended in 1783. The Americans suffered significant casualties and lost important supplies, but Washington managed to retain the core of his army and avoid a decisive confrontation that could have ended the war. With the bold strokes of Trenton and Princeton, he had regained initiative and boosted morale. The areas around New York City in New York, New Jersey, and Connecticut were an ongoing battleground for the rest of the war.

The early reports that General Howe sent to his superiors in London concerning the battles at Trenton and Princeton attempted to minimize their significance, blaming Rall for Trenton and trying to recast Princeton as a nearly successful defense. Not everyone was fooled by his accounts, particularly not Lord Germain. In a letter to the Hessian General Leopold Philip von Heister, Germain wrote that "the officer who commanded [the forces at Trenton] and to whom this misfortune is to be attributed has lost his life by his rashness." Heister in turn had to report the loss to his ruler, Frederick II, Landgrave of Hesse-Kassel, with the news that not only had an entire brigade been lost, but sixteen regimental colors and six cannon as well. The news reportedly enraged Frederick, who broadly suggested that Heister return home (which he did, turning over command of the Hessian forces to Wilhelm von Knyphausen). Frederick also ordered extensive inquiries into the events of 1776, that took place in New York from 1778 to 1782. These inquiries created a unique archive of materials about the campaign.

The news of Washington's successes reached Paris at a critical time. Britain's ambassador to France, Lord Stormont, was preparing complaints to France's foreign minister, the Comte de Vergennes, concerning the semi-secret financial and logistical support France had been giving to the revolutionaries. Stormont had learned that supplies bound for America were to be shipped under French flags, where they had previously been sent under American colors. He wrote that the French court was extremely happy with the news, and that the French diplomatic position noticeably hardened: "that M. de Vergennes is hostile in his heart and anxious for the success of the Rebels I have not a shadow of a doubt."

== Next steps ==
The British planned two major operations for the 1777 campaign season. The first was an ambitious plan to gain control of the Hudson River valley, whose central thrust was a move along Lake Champlain by the army from Quebec under General John Burgoyne. Execution of this plan ultimately failed, ending with the surrender of Burgoyne's army at Saratoga, New York, in October. The second operation was General Howe's plan to take Philadelphia, which, after a difficult start, met with success in September.

Washington's strategy in 1777 continued to be a basically defensive one. He successfully fended off an attempt by Howe to draw him into a general engagement in northern New Jersey, but was unable to prevent Howe's later success taking Philadelphia. He did send material help to General Horatio Gates, who was tasked with defending against Burgoyne's movements. Major General Benedict Arnold and Daniel Morgan's riflemen all played a notable role in the defeat of Burgoyne, following which France entered the war.

== Legacy ==
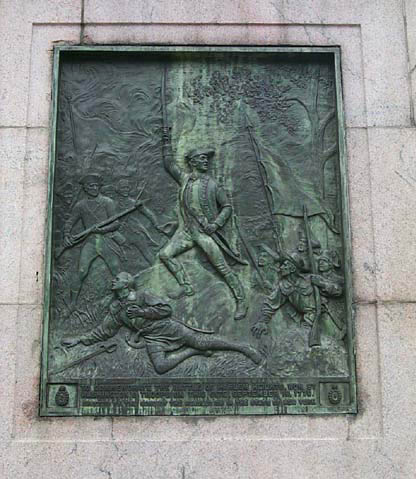
Plaque commemorating the Battle of Harlem Heights at Columbia University

In the urban environments of Manhattan, Brooklyn, The Bronx, Westchester, and Trenton, there are plaques and other memorials placed to commemorate the actions that took place in and around those locations. The Princeton Battlefield and Washington's Crossing are National Historic Landmarks, with state parks also preserving all or part of the locations where events of this campaign occurred in those areas. Morristown National Historical Park preserves locations occupied by the Continental Army during the winter months at the end of the campaign.

When the illustrious part that your Excellency has borne in this long and arduous contest becomes a matter of history, fame will gather your brightest laurels rather from the banks of the Delaware than from those of the Chesapeake.

— Cornwallis, to Washington after dining with him following the Siege of Yorktown, 1781

== See also ==
- American Revolutionary War#Early engagements
- List of American Revolutionary War battles
- New York Armory Raid
