= Weston, New Jersey =

Populated place in Somerset County, New Jersey, US

- Census-designated place
- Location in Somerset County Location in New Jersey Location in the United States
- Coordinates: 40.527045°N 74.56718°W
- Country: United States
- State: New Jersey
- County: Somerset
- Township: Franklin

Area
  - Total: 1.44 sq mi (3.74 km^{2})
  - Land: 1.39 sq mi (3.61 km^{2})
  - Water: 0.050 sq mi (0.13 km^{2}) 3.58%
- Elevation: 95 ft (29 m)

Population (2020)
  - Total: 2,023
  - Density: 1,452.1/sq mi (560.65/km^{2})
- Time zone: UTC−05:00 (Eastern (EST))
  - Summer (DST): UTC−04:00 (Eastern (EDT))
- Area codes: 609/640 and 732/848
- FIPS code: 34-79715
- GNIS feature ID: 02584040

Weston is an unincorporated community and census-designated place (CDP) located in Franklin Township, in Somerset County, in the U.S. state of New Jersey. As of the 2020 census, Weston had a population of 2,023.

Situated on the east side of the Millstone River north of East Millstone and south of Zarephath (which has grown to include some of the area once considered Weston), early names used for the area were Schenck's Mill, Van Nest's Mill and Frogtown. Historically, an area on the west side of the river in what is now part of the borough of Manville was also referred to as Weston (and is labeled as such on official present-day maps).

== Causeway ==
The Weston Causeway is the only bridge across the Millstone River and the Delaware and Raritan Canal between East Millstone and the confluence with the Raritan River near South Bound Brook. It is signed as County Route 623. Although official state records give the name of the crossing on the Manville Boro side of the Millstone River as Wilhousky Street and on the Franklin Twp side as Weston Causeway, the causeway is also interchangeably referred to as the Manville Causeway by local governments.

Portions of Delaware and Raritan Canal State Park are immediately adjacent to the causeway, including the Main Canal Trail, the historic site Weston Causeway Bridge Tender's House, and two small parking areas.

== History ==
Heinrich/Henry Schenck built a grist mill on the east bank of the Millstone here, probably in the 1740s. His brother, Peter, built a mill upstream at Blackwells Mills about the same time and both were called Schenck's Mill. Three of Henry's sons, Abraham, John and Henry were in the second graduating class of 14 students of the newly founded Queen's College that later became Rutgers University. His daughter, Gertrude Schenck, married Fredrick Frelinghuysen, son of the Dutch-reformed minister and tutor to the boys at Queen's College. Frelinghuysen would attend the Continental Congress, rise to rank of Major General, and become a US Senator and US District Attorney. Fredrick and Gertrude would start the #6 ranked political dynasty in American history. In 2018, U.S. Representative from New Jersey, Rodney Frelinghuysen retired, ending the dynasty.

The second owner of the mill was Abraham Van Neste, from 1771-1797. During his tenure, on January 21, 1777, there was a skirmish at the mill, known as the Battle of Millstone or the Battle of Van Nest's Mill, between a British foraging party of about 600 troops, sent out of New Brunswick by General Cornwallis, seeking the large quantity of flour they believed was stored there and a party of about 450 militia including Frelinghuysen and the Schencks, commanded by General Philemon Dickinson. With the bridge at Weston guarded by the British, the American force had to wade across the waist deep, ice-filled river. Nevertheless, they so surprised the foraging party the British retreated without ever firing a single one of their three field pieces. In their haste, the British left behind 43 wagons, 164 horses, 118 cattle, 70 sheep and 12 soldiers who became prisoners. In the skirmish, 5 Americans were lost but the British lost about 30 men.

When William Rodgers owned the mill between 1823 and 1843, he changed the name to Weston, purportedly to reflect the name used at the time for an area across the river from the mill.

The Delaware and Raritan Canal was completed through Weston in 1834 and a Bridgetender's House, now unused, is located on the southeast side of the bridge. The Canal Company maintained one of its six telegraph stations in Weston. Used to send express messages regarding damage to locks and bridges, breaks in or poor conditions of the canal banks, unusual water levels, boat accidents and speeders to other stations and the company office, the Canal Company is believed to have been one of the first users of the Morse telegraph in the United States. Unlike other communities located near the canal, Weston does not seem to have received any significant benefits from its construction.

By the 1880s Weston included a post office, schoolhouse, blacksmith shop, store, gristmill, sawmill, and about 15 dwellings.

Wilbur Smith was the last owner of the original mill from 1925 until 1982 when it fell into the river. He had worked for many years in an attempt to save the old mill but, after it collapsed, it was determined that it was beyond repair and now considered a flood hazard. There were plans to salvage parts of the historic structure but before the group, the Meadows Foundation, had a chance to do much work, vandals set the mill on fire, destroying what was left of it.

With the mill gone, all that remains in the area once known as Weston are a few residences and several roads bearing the name.

== Geography ==
According to the United States Census Bureau, Weston had a total area of 1.447 square miles (3.748 km^{2}), including 1.395 square miles (3.614 km^{2}) of land and 0.052 square miles (0.134 km^{2}) of water (3.58%).

== Demographics ==
Historical population
Census	Pop.	Note	%±
2010	1,235		—
2020	2,023		63.8%
Population sources: 2010

Weston first appeared as a census designated place in the 2010 U.S. census.

=== Racial and ethnic composition ===
Weston CDP, New Jersey – Racial and ethnic composition Note: the US Census treats Hispanic/Latino as an ethnic category. This table excludes Latinos from the racial categories and assigns them to a separate category. Hispanics/Latinos may be of any race.
Race / Ethnicity (NH = Non-Hispanic)	Pop 2010	Pop 2020	% 2010	% 2020
White alone (NH)	1,061	1,609	85.91%	79.54%
Black or African American alone (NH)	39	41	3.16%	2.03%
Native American or Alaska Native alone (NH)	0	3	0.00%	0.15%
Asian alone (NH)	87	252	7.04%	12.46%
Native Hawaiian or Pacific Islander alone (NH)	0	0	0.00%	0.00%
Other race alone (NH)	0	10	0.00%	0.49%
Mixed race or Multiracial (NH)	13	40	1.05%	1.98%
Hispanic or Latino (any race)	35	68	2.83%	3.36%
Total	1,235	2,023	100.00%	100.00%

=== 2020 census ===
As of the 2020 census, Weston had a population of 2,023. The median age was 72.3 years. 1.2% of residents were under the age of 18 and 76.9% of residents were 65 years of age or older. For every 100 females there were 71.2 males, and for every 100 females age 18 and over there were 70.9 males age 18 and over.

98.3% of residents lived in urban areas, while 1.7% lived in rural areas.

There were 1,174 households in Weston, of which 2.3% had children under the age of 18 living in them. Of all households, 54.9% were married-couple households, 7.7% were households with a male householder and no spouse or partner present, and 35.1% were households with a female householder and no spouse or partner present. About 36.8% of all households were made up of individuals and 31.7% had someone living alone who was 65 years of age or older.

There were 1,283 housing units, of which 8.5% were vacant. The homeowner vacancy rate was 1.8% and the rental vacancy rate was 10.7%.

=== 2010 census ===
The 2010 United States census counted 1,235 people, 666 households, and 461 families in the CDP. The population density was 885.0 per square mile (341.7/km^{2}). There were 703 housing units at an average density of 503.8 per square mile (194.5/km^{2}). The racial makeup was 87.85% (1,085) White, 3.24% (40) Black or African American, 0.00% (0) Native American, 7.13% (88) Asian, 0.00% (0) Pacific Islander, 0.73% (9) from other races, and 1.05% (13) from two or more races. Hispanic or Latino of any race were 2.83% (35) of the population.

Of the 666 households, 0.8% had children under the age of 18; 64.6% were married couples living together; 4.4% had a female householder with no husband present and 30.8% were non-families. Of all households, 27.9% were made up of individuals and 20.4% had someone living alone who was 65 years of age or older. The average household size was 1.85 and the average family size was 2.18.

1.2% of the population were under the age of 18, 1.1% from 18 to 24, 6.2% from 25 to 44, 31.9% from 45 to 64, and 59.6% who were 65 years of age or older. The median age was 67.5 years. For every 100 females, the population had 79.5 males. For every 100 females ages 18 and older there were 79.7 males.

== See also ==
- Battle of Millstone
- Manville, New Jersey
- Van Nest – Weston Burying Ground
- Zarephath, New Jersey
