= 1778 New Jersey gubernatorial election =

- October 31, 1778
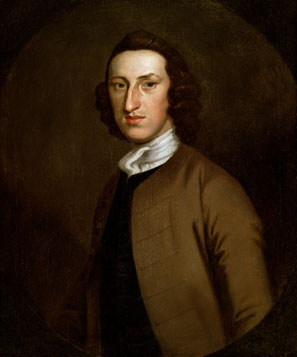

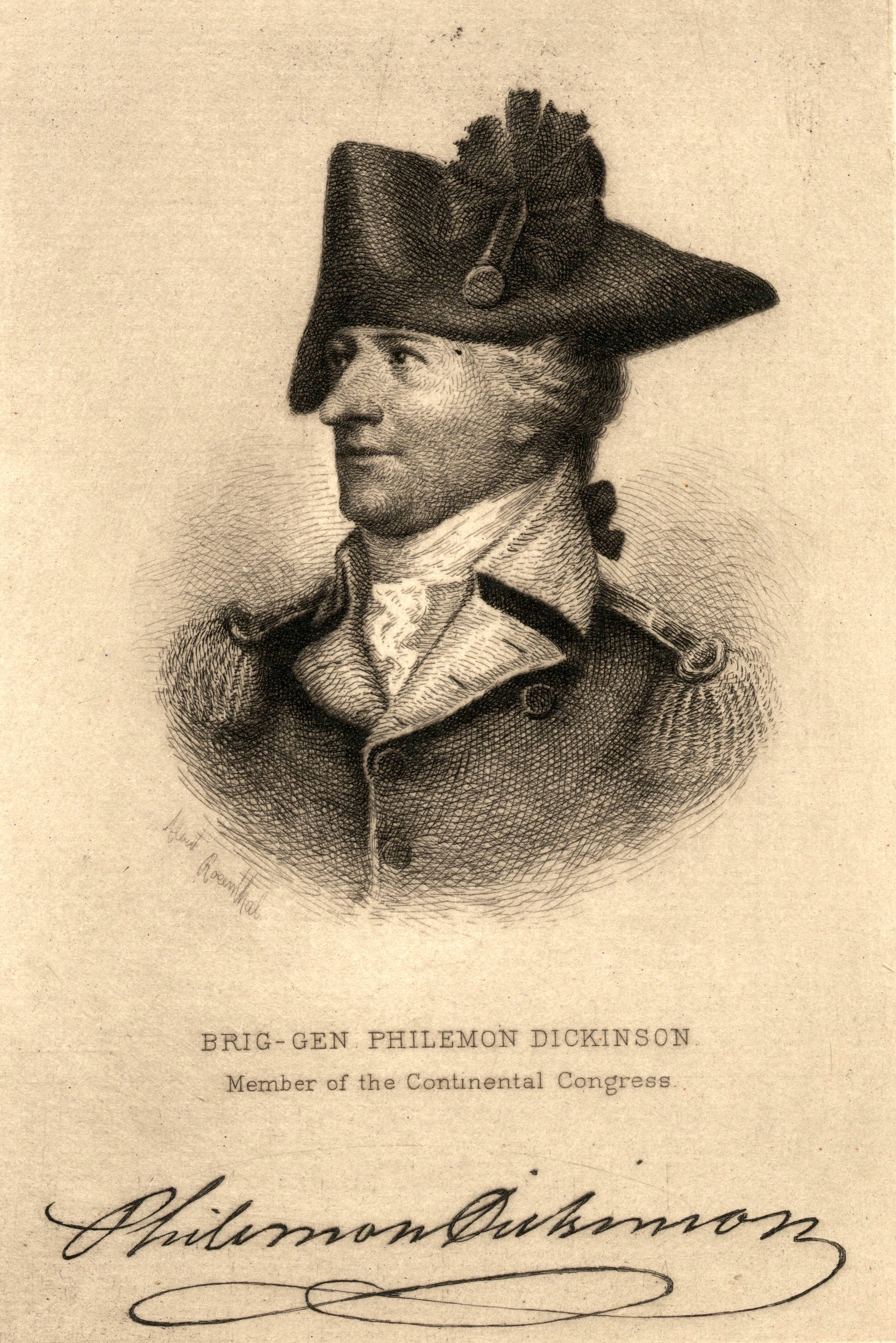
Nominee	William Livingston	Philemon Dickinson
Party	Nonpartisan	Nonpartisan
Popular vote	31	6
Percentage	83.78%	16.22%
Governor before election
William Livingston
Nonpartisan
Elected Governor
William Livingston
Nonpartisan

The 1778 New Jersey gubernatorial election was held on October 31, 1778, in order to elect the Governor of New Jersey. Incumbent Governor William Livingston was re-elected by the New Jersey General Assembly against his opponent candidate Philemon Dickinson.

== General election ==
On election day, October 31, 1778, incumbent Governor William Livingston was re-elected by the New Jersey General Assembly by a margin of 25 votes against his opponent candidate Philemon Dickinson. Livingston was sworn in for his third term that same day.

=== Results ===
New Jersey gubernatorial election, 1778
Party	Candidate	Votes	%
Nonpartisan	William Livingston (incumbent)	31	83.78%
Nonpartisan	Philemon Dickinson	6	16.22%
Total votes		37	100.00%
Nonpartisan hold			
