= Battle of Millstone =

Skirmish in the American Revolutionary War

Coordinates: 40°32′20″N 74°35′36″W

- Part of the American Revolutionary War
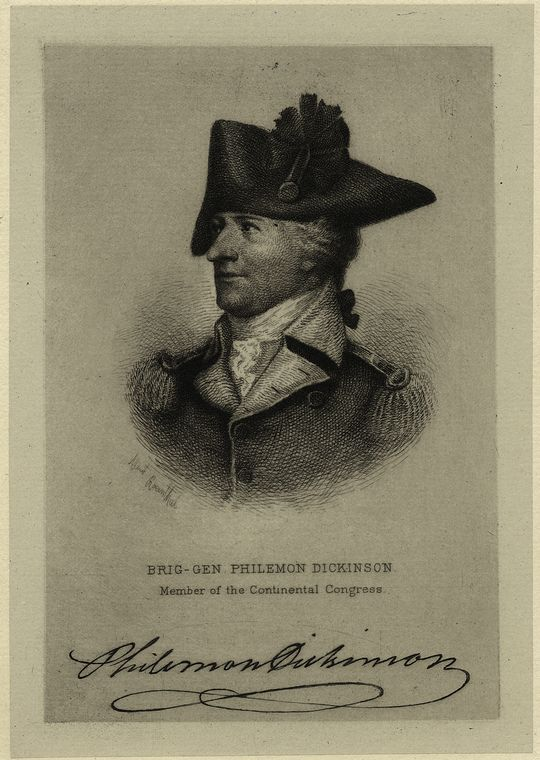
- Brigadier General Philemon Dickinson
Date	January 20, 1777
Location	present-day Manville, New Jersey
Result	American victory

Belligerents
United States	Great Britain

Commanders and leaders
Philemon Dickinson	Robert Abercromby

Strength
450	500

Casualties and losses
4–5 killed or wounded	25 killed or wounded 12 captured

The Battle of Millstone, also known as the Battle of Van Nest's Mill, was a skirmish that occurred near the mill of Abraham Van Neste in Weston, New Jersey (near present-day Manville, New Jersey) on January 20, 1777, during the American Revolutionary War. A British foraging party was flanked and driven off by forces composed mostly of New Jersey militia, depriving the British of their wagons and supplies.

This action was one of a series of skirmishes known as the Forage War that persisted in northern New Jersey through the first few months of 1777, and it demonstrated that militia companies were capable of putting up a significant fight.

== Background ==
After George Washington's successful movements around the army of Charles Cornwallis that culminated in the Battle of Princeton on January 3, 1777, Washington faced the dilemma of being caught between Cornwallis in Trenton, New Jersey and the rest of the British Army at New Brunswick, New Jersey. Rather than make an attempt on the British outpost at New Brunswick with his exhausted troops, Washington moved his army up the Millstone River valley toward Morristown, New Jersey, a place he knew could be strongly fortified and used as winter quarters. Cornwallis and the remaining British and Hessian troops in and around Trenton and Princeton withdrew to New Brunswick to regroup after the battle at Princeton.

On January 13, a significant portion of the British army advanced from New Brunswick west to Somerset Court House (present-day Millstone, New Jersey), and remained there for about a week before retreating back to New Brunswick, destroying houses and plundering supplies. During this time, militia companies mustered to assist the Continental Army. These movements established the area west of New Brunswick up to the Millstone and Raritan rivers as a no man's land between the two forces. Following the British retreat, Somerset Court House became one of several outposts garrisoned by Patriot militia companies, with support from the Continental Army.

== Battle ==
A British foraging party of 500 men, led by Lieutenant Colonel Robert Abercromby of the 37th Foot, left New Brunswick on January 20, and headed west toward the Millstone River. They crossed over the river (it is unclear exactly which bridge they used), leaving a rear guard of Hessians with some field artillery to cover the bridge, and eventually reached Van Nest's mill at Weston, New Jersey (near present-day Manville, New Jersey), a few miles north of Somerset Court House, and near the point where the Millstone empties into the Raritan. There they seized supplies of all varieties, and prepared to return to New Brunswick.

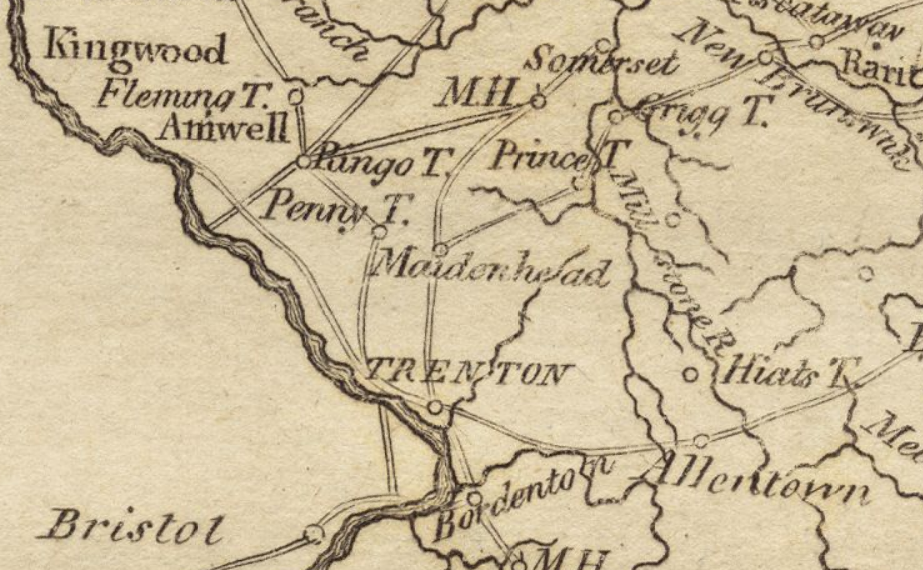
An 1806 map of central New Jersey

Militia companies to the north were alerted to the British movement early in the day, and some marched for Bound Brook, New Jersey. When reports arrived of the activity at Van Nest's mill, they marched for that place. In all about 400 New Jersey militia and 50 Pennsylvania militia formed under Brigadier General Philemon Dickinson to dispute the British action. While detailed accounts of their movements are sketchy, Dickinson apparently divided his forces, sending one force to meet the front of the British wagon train, while a second moved to flank them. Both of these forces forded one of the rivers, wading in icy water that was waist deep. One successfully surprised the British wagon train in the lane near the mill, before it reached the main road and the bridge toward New Brunswick; their fire struck horses from the first wagon. This stopped the train, scattered the wagon drivers and drove the British to retreat precipitously toward the bridge, leaving their booty behind.

When the militiamen reached the bridge, the Hessian rear guard fired grape shot from its artillery to cover the retreat. After an exchange of fire across the river without apparent consequence, the British withdrew.

== Aftermath ==
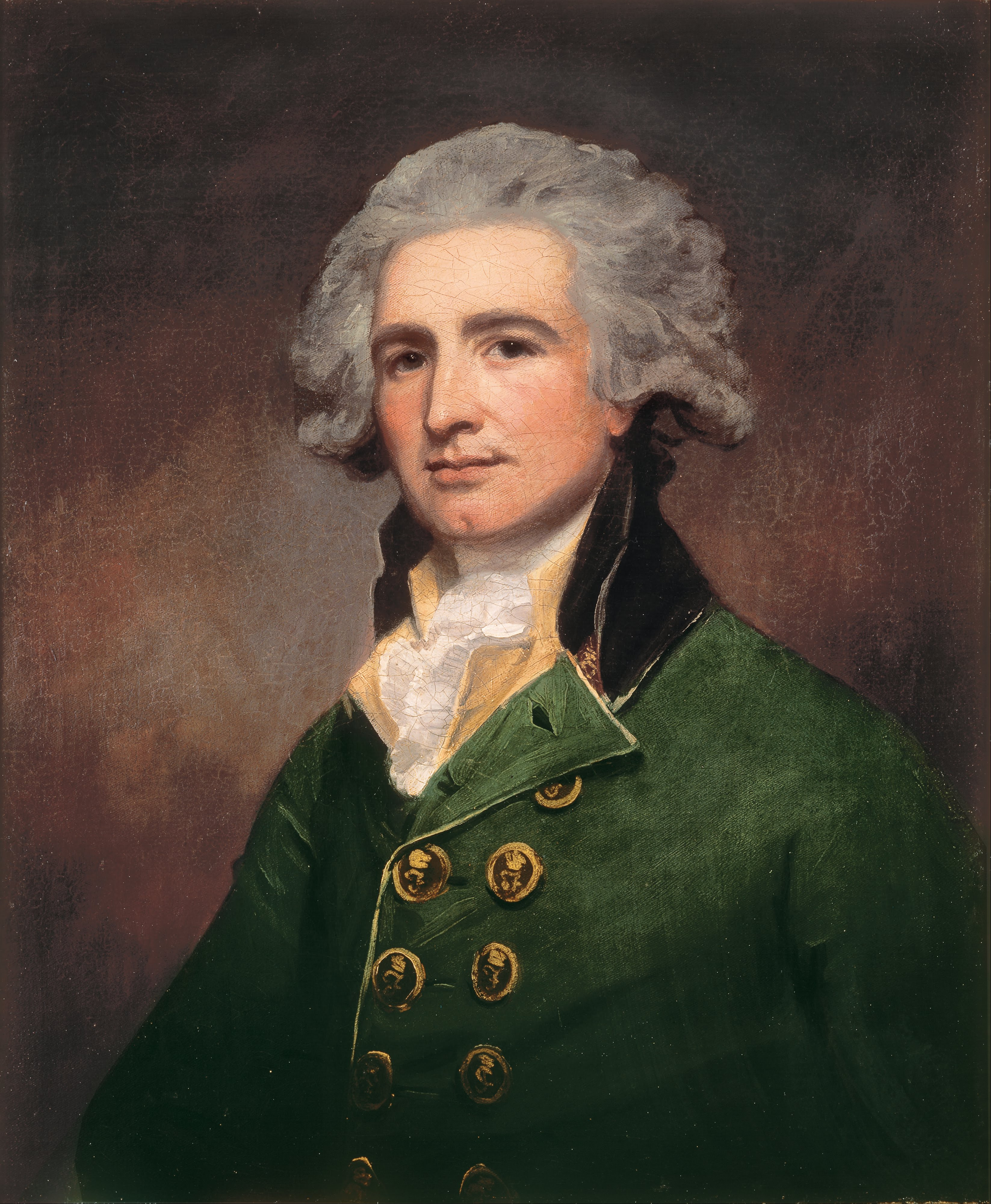
Lt Col Robert Abercromby

Dickinson wrote in a letter to Colonel John Nielson on January 23, "I have the pleasure to inform you that on Monday last with about 450 men chiefly our militia I attacked a foraging party near V. Nest Mills consisting of 500 men with 2 field pieces, which we routed after an engagement of 20 minutes and brought off 107 horses, 49 wagons, 115 cattle, 70 sheep, 40 barrels of flour - 106 bags and many other things, 49 prisoners." General Washington, who was not always happy with the performance of the militias, wrote, "Genl Dickinsons behaviour reflects the highest honour upon him, for tho' his Troops were all raw, he lead [sic] them thro' the River, middle deep, and gave the Enemy so severe a charge, that, altho' supported by three field pieces, they gave way and left their Convoy", and only reported the taking of nine prisoners.

Archibald Robertson, a British officer who was not part of the expedition, reported that "Lieutenant Colonel Abercromby with 500 men went on a foraging party towards Hillsborough. Part of this Corps was attacked by the Rebels, which occasion'd such disorder Amongst the Waggon Drivers that 42 Waggons were left behind." One British witness was "absolutely certain the attackers were not militia, they were sure that no militia would fight in that way."

Casualty figures were extremely variable, but British casualties (killed, wounded, or captured) appear to have been in the low 30s according to press accounts (contrary to Dickinson's claim of 49 prisoners taken), while militia casualties were relatively small in number.

Skirmishing continued between American and British forces throughout the winter in a period that historian David Hackett Fischer dubbed the Forage War, since it revolved around the British need for forage for its horses. The American tactics, primarily driven by New Jersey militia commanders but supported by Washington and the Continentals, were so successful that even British foraging parties of 2,000 men came under attack at the Battle of Quibbletown (present-day New Market, New Jersey) on February 8.
