= Gen. Philemon Dickinson House =

Historic house in New Jersey, United States

- Gen. Philemon Dickinson House "The Hermitage"
- U.S. National Register of Historic Places
- New Jersey Register of Historic Places
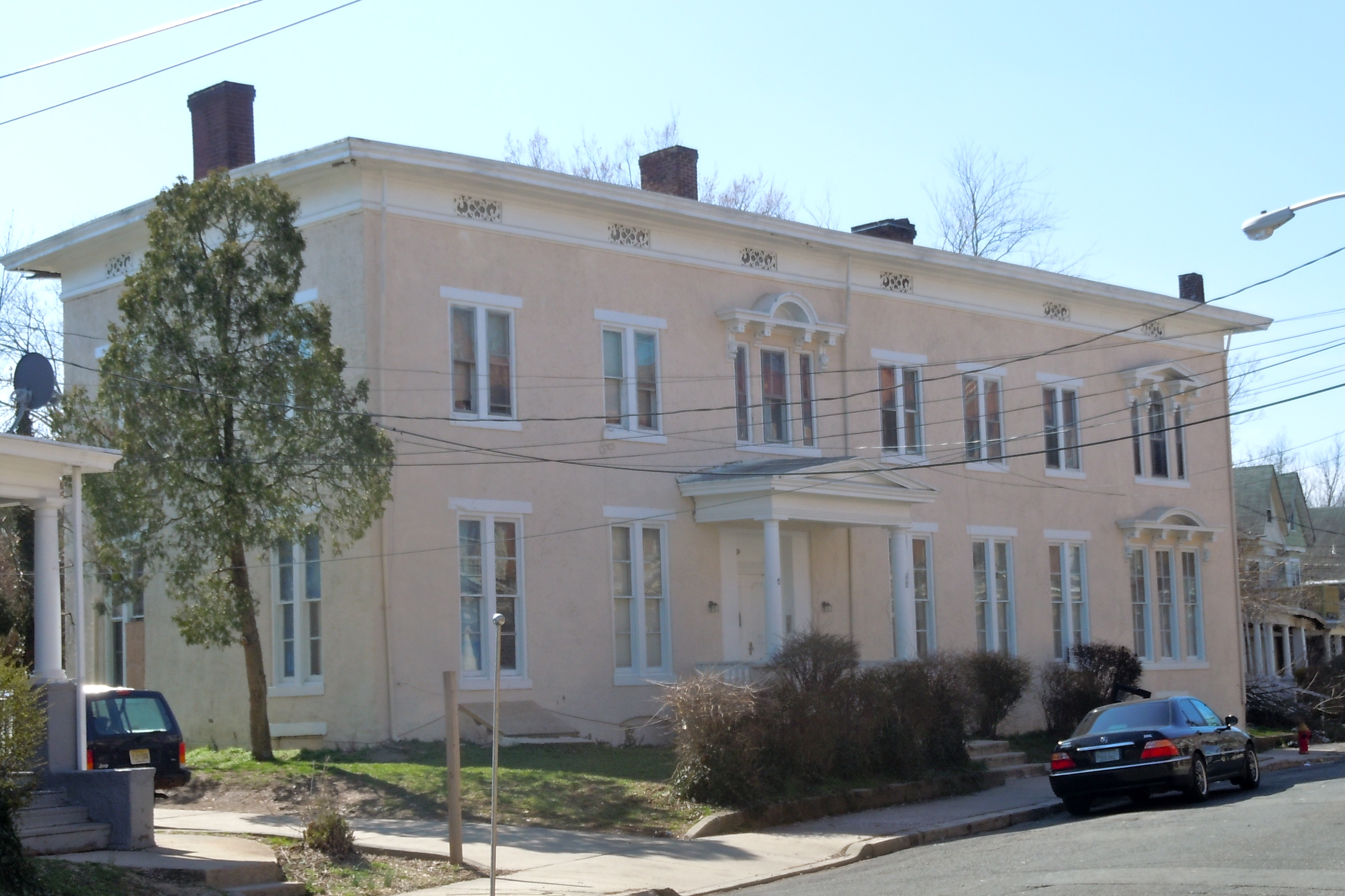

- Location within Mercer County, New Jersey Location within New Jersey Location within the United States
- Location: 46 Colonial Avenue, Trenton, New Jersey
- Coordinates: 40°13′36″N 74°47′1″W
- Area: 0.3 acres (0.12 ha)
- NRHP reference No.: 74001172
- NJRHP No.: 1765

Significant dates
- Added to NRHP: May 17, 1974
- Designated NJRHP: September 18, 1973

Gen. Philemon Dickinson House is located in Trenton, Mercer County, New Jersey, United States.

The original frame house was built by the Rutherford family about 1760. General Philemon Dickinson (1739-1809) bought it in July 1776, as a rural retreat along the Delaware River, and named it "The Hermitage." He lived here with his wife Mary Cadwalader and children, Mary and Samuel. The frame house was torn down about 1905, but a much larger stone-and-stucco addition built in 1784 still stands. The addition was extensively remodeled in the Italianate style in the mid-19th century.

During his partial term as U.S. Senator from New Jersey (1790–93), Dickinson hosted First Lady Martha Washington as a houseguest (May 17–19, 1791). President John Adams was frequently entertained during the summer of 1798, when yellow fever in Philadelphia caused the federal government to evacuate to Trenton, although he lodged at a nearby hotel. Benjamin Franklin, Thomas Jefferson, and Alexander Hamilton were reportedly guests, along with Frenchmen General Rochambeau, Joseph Bonaparte, and Louis Philippe (later King of France).

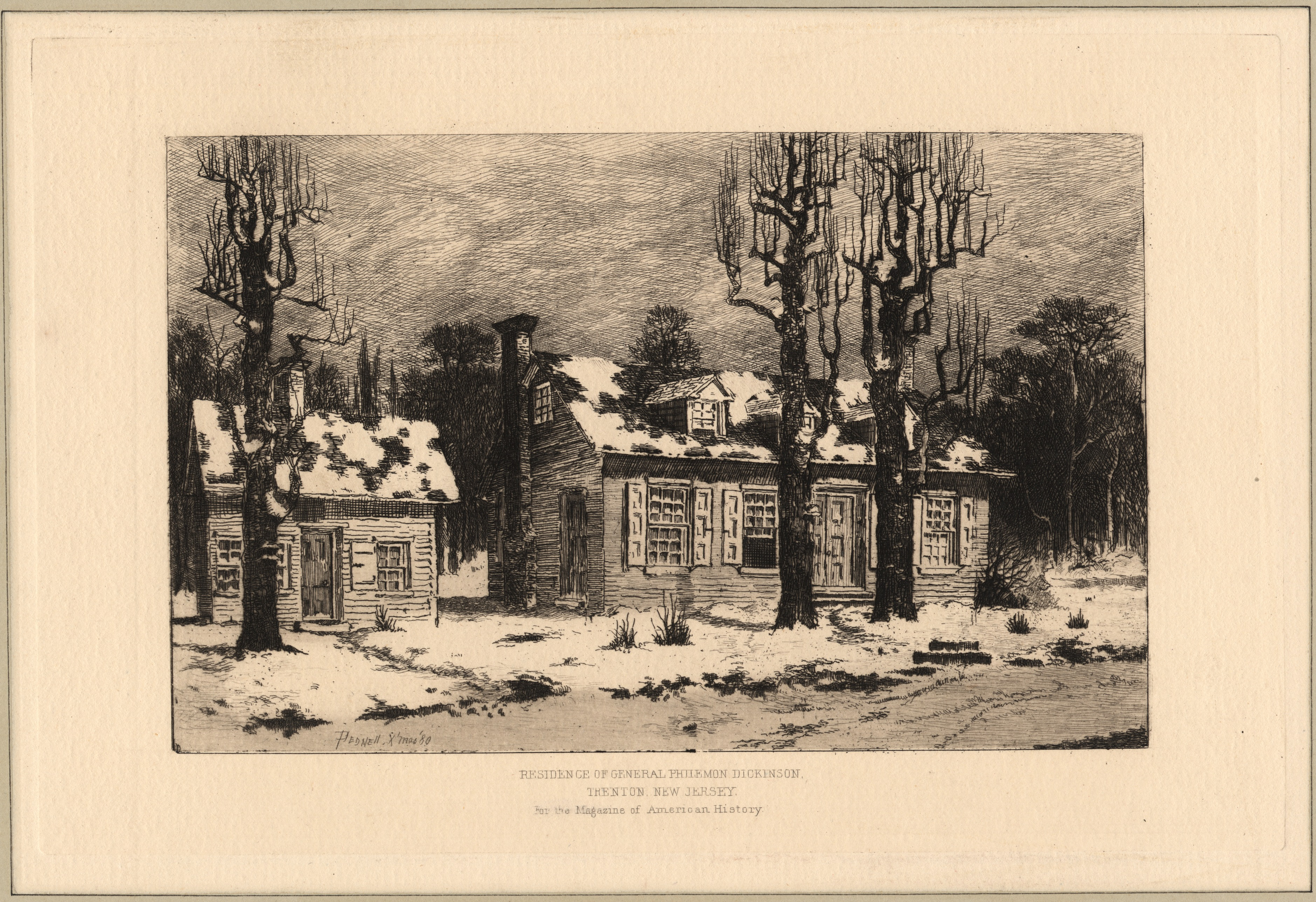
House as shown in an 1820 publication

In the early-20th century, the street grid was expanded around the house (note that the building sits at an angle to Colonial Avenue). The house has been converted into apartments.

The building was added to the National Register of Historic Places on May 17, 1974, for its significance in military history. Trenton Historical Society lists it as one of the top ten endangered buildings in the city.

== See also ==
- National Register of Historic Places listings in Mercer County, New Jersey
