= New Market, Middlesex County, New Jersey =

Populated place in Middlesex County, New Jersey, US

New Market, New Jersey
- Unincorporated community
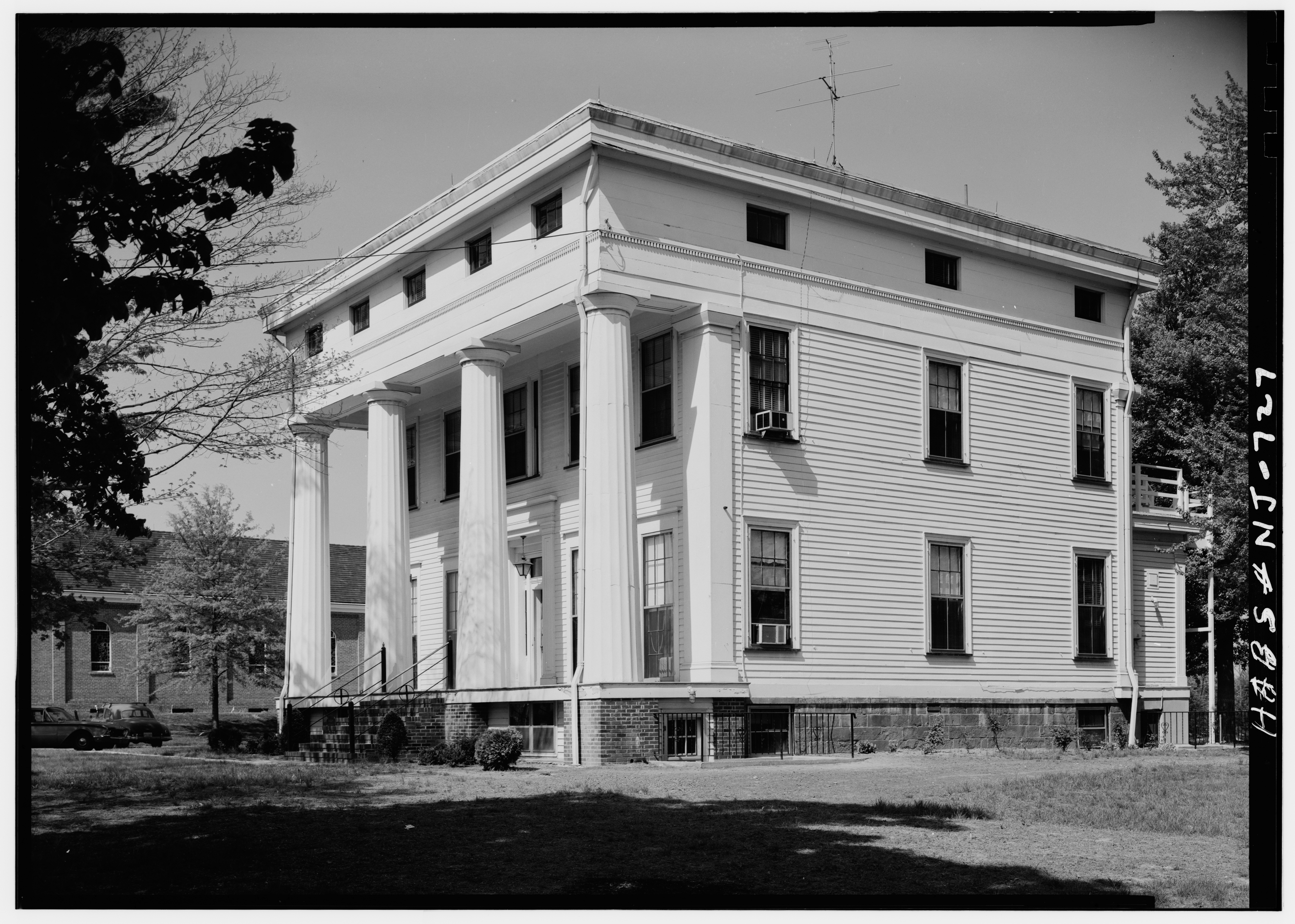
- William Vail House on New Market Street

- Location within Middlesex County, New Jersey Location within New Jersey Location within the United States
- Coordinates: 40°34′27″N 74°27′09″W
- Country: United States
- State: New Jersey
- County: Middlesex
- Township: Piscataway
- Elevation: 75 ft (23 m)
- GNIS feature ID: 878746

New Market is an unincorporated community located within Piscataway in Middlesex County, in the U.S. state of New Jersey. It was also known historically as Quibbletown, so called because of a dispute as to whether the Sabbath was on Saturday or Sunday.

== Columbus Park ==
The Columbus Park playground with areas for baseball and tennis is located at 250 11th Street. The Columbus Park gazebo area located at the west end on New Market Pond is often used for concerts. The Battle of Quibbletown, fought on February 8, 1777, was commemorated in the park for the 350th anniversary of the township's founding in 2016.

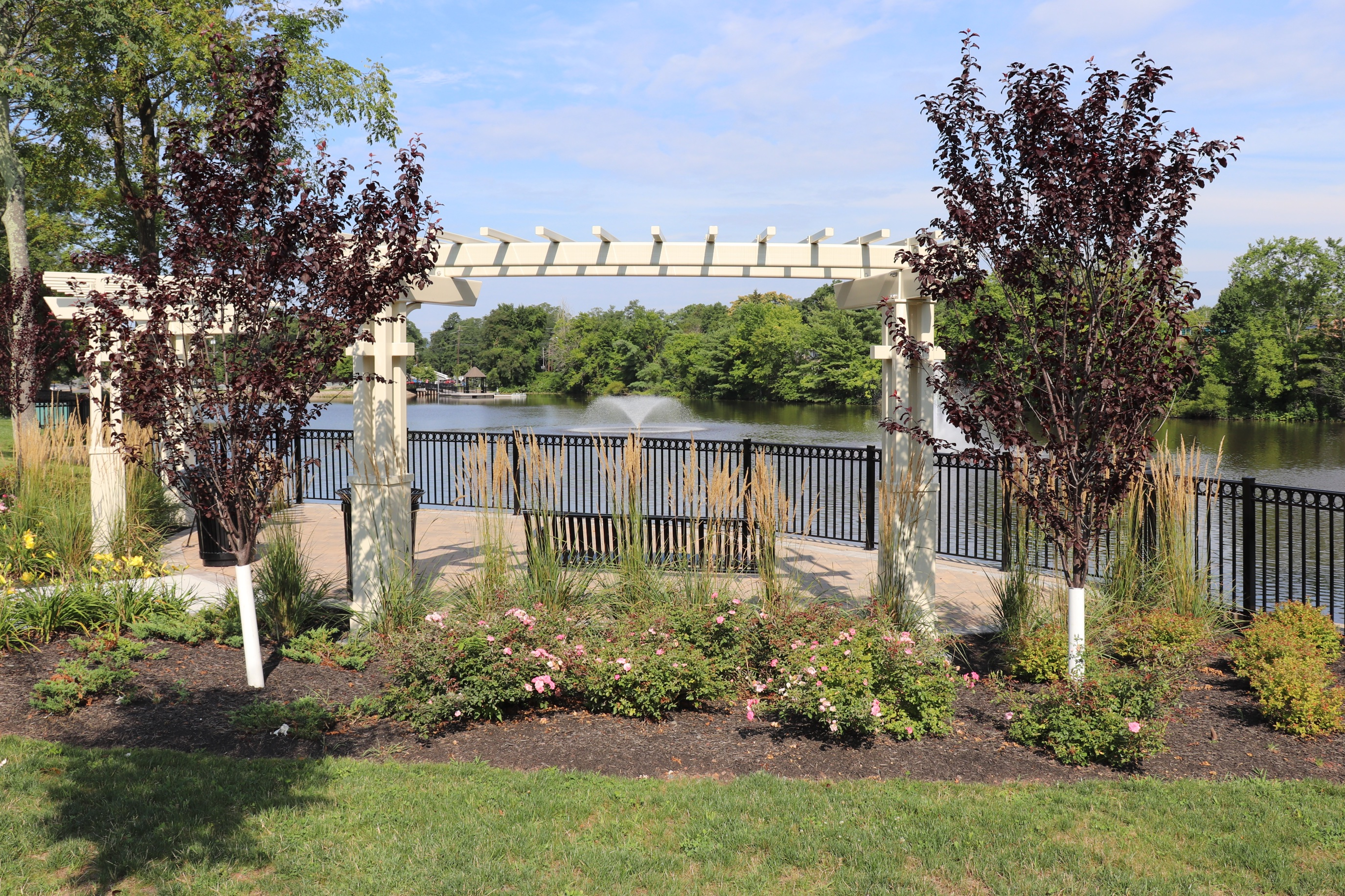
Columbus Park by New Market Pond

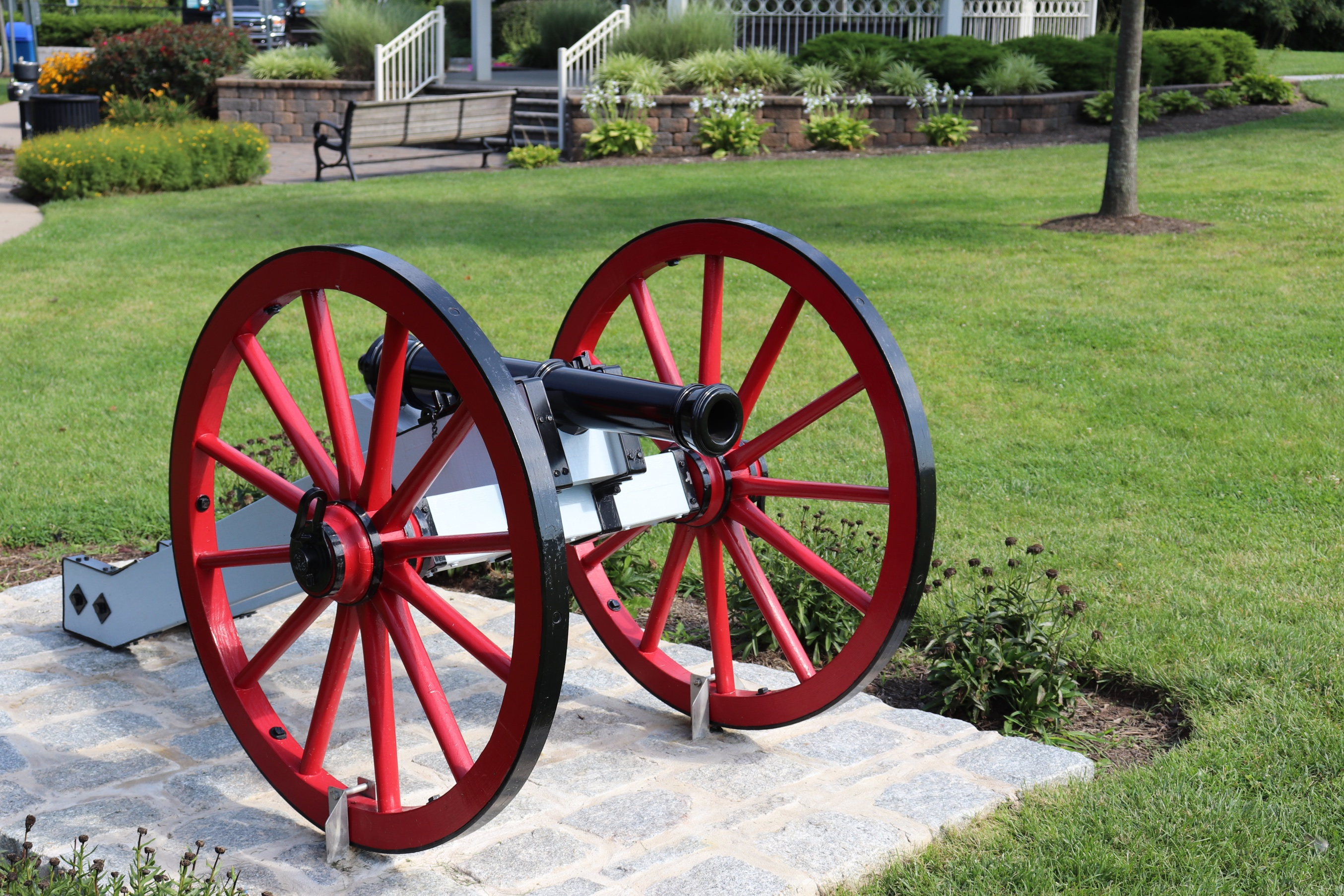
Cannon by Columbus Park gazebo
