= Abraham Van Neste =

American politician (1713–1779)

- Born: October 1713; Raritan, New Jersey
- Died: August 15, 1779 (aged 65); Raritan, New Jersey
- Occupations: merchant, Judge

Abraham Van Neste (October 1713 – August 15, 1779) was an American merchant and judge. Van Neste was born on October, 1713, in Raritan, New Jersey to Joris Pietersen Van Nest and Marytje Reyniersen Van Hengel, and was baptised on October 17, 1713.

== Career ==
He was one of the nine deputies who met at Trenton, New Jersey on May 23, 1775, and August 5, 1775, as a representative of Somerset County in the Provincial Congress of New Jersey. He was a judge in Somerset County, New Jersey.

He was appointed Justice of the Peace in 1761 and a Justice of Quorum in 1768. He was elected to the New Jersey Senate in 1778.

On December 27, 1771, he purchased 52 acres of land on either side of the Millstone River. He owned a mercantile business with Frederick Van Liew. He owned two grist mills, known as Van Nest's Mills, on the eastern side of the Millstone River.

On December 15, 1774, he was appointed to the Committee of Correspondence for Somerset County, New Jersey. In 1779, he was a member of the Somerset Assembly.

== Battle of Van Nest's Mill/Battle of Millstone ==
The Battle of Millstone, also known as the Battle of Van Nest's Mills, took place near his mills in Weston, New Jersey in present-day Manville, New Jersey. A British foraging party began taking supplies from the farm and mills of Van Nest. The foragers were on their way back to New Brunswick, New Jersey when they ran into the American troops and a battle ensued.

== Incident at his home ==
In 1779, several Continental soldiers were staying at his home during the American Revolutionary War. Brigadier General Anthony Wayne and his subordinate soldiers occupied Van Nest's home during the war. During their stay at the house, there was a confrontation that required legal assistance, which was brought to the attention of General George Washington.

On January 25, 1779, Major Benjamin Fishbourn, the Aide-de-camp to Brig. Gen. Wayne, and Samuel Wright had their sleeping quarters in the same room as Van Nest. They went up the stairs to find the room locked and started an argument with Van Nest. Van Nest apparently threatened to shoot Fishbourn. Fishbourn assaulted Van Nest.

The next morning, on January 26, 1779, Peter Davis, the Somerset County Constable, attempted to serve a warrant on Fishbourn and Wright for their arrests as a result of the assault. General Wayne prevented the constable from serving the warrant and asked to see the warrant. Brig. Gen. Wayne ordered his subordinate, Samuel Wright to remove the Constable.

On March 9, 1779, New Jersey Governor William Livingston brought the incident to the attention of General George Washington.

On March 16, 1779, General Washington wrote to Brig. Gen. Wayne and instructed him to return with Major Fishbourne and address the issue with the court.

In a letter to General Washington, dated March 23, 1779, Brig. Gen. Wayne claimed that he was concerned when the constable would not show the warrant to him and was worried about the possibility of him being a spy.

== Family and death ==
He married Sarah Bergen in Somerset County, New Jersey in 1739. Their son, Abraham Van Nest Jr. served in the Somerset County militia and the Continental Army as an ensign during the American Revolutionary War.

He died on August 16, 1779, in Raritan, New Jersey.

His great-grandson, John Alfred Van Neste, played for Rutgers in the first ever college football game.
