= Philemon Dickinson =

American soldier (1739–1809)

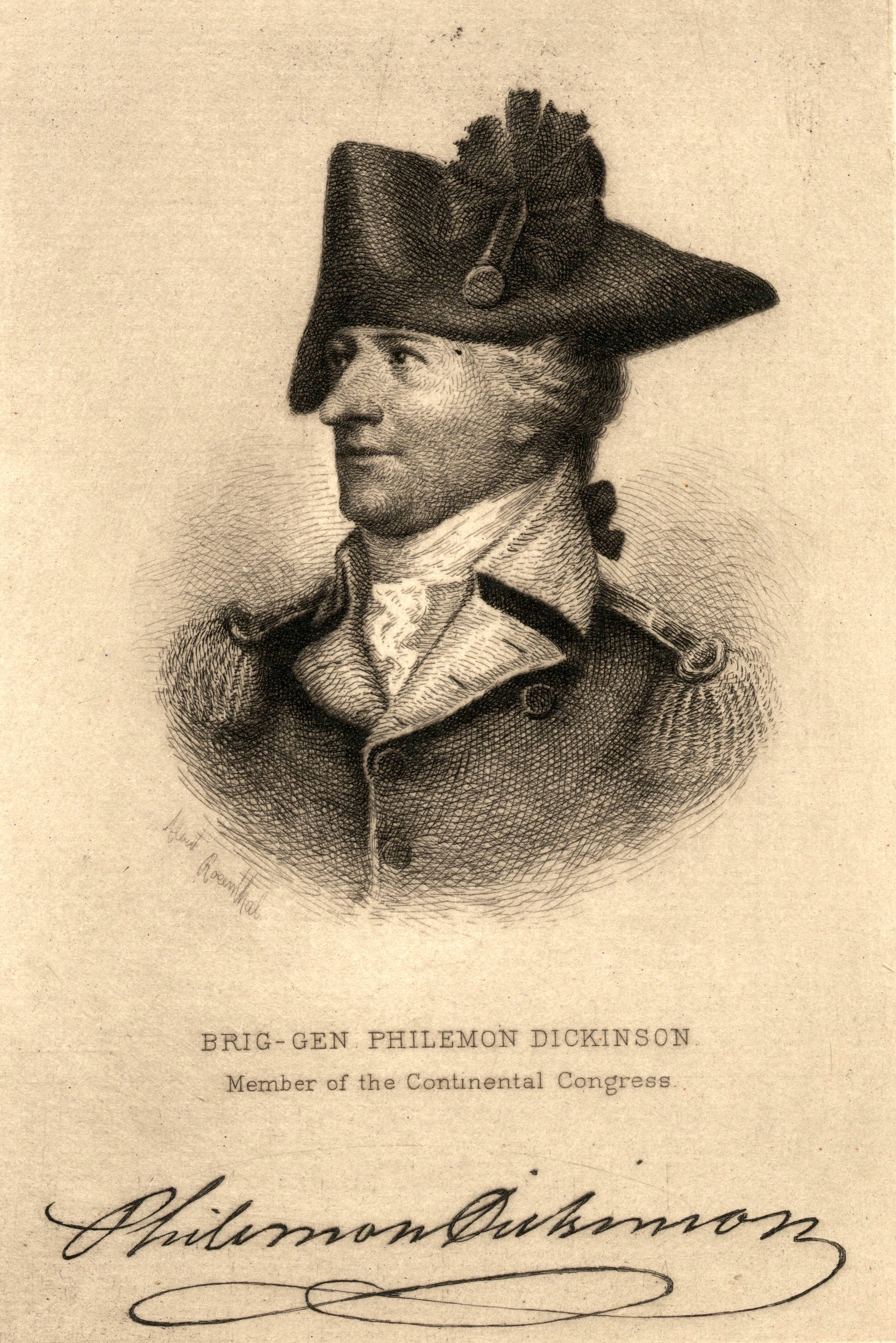

United States Senator from New Jersey
- In office November 23, 1790 – March 3, 1793
- Preceded by: William Paterson
- Succeeded by: Frederick Frelinghuysen

Personal details
- Born: April 5, 1739 Trappe, Province of Maryland
- Died: February 4, 1809 (aged 69) Trenton, New Jersey
- Party: Pro-Administration
- Education: University of Pennsylvania

Military service
- Allegiance: United States
- Branch/service: Continental Army
- Battles/wars: American Revolutionary War

Philemon Dickinson (April 5, 1739 – February 4, 1809) was an American lawyer and politician from Trenton, New Jersey. As a brigadier general of the New Jersey militia, he was one of the most effective militia officers of the American Revolutionary War. He was also a Continental Congressman from Delaware and a United States Senator from New Jersey.

== Background ==
Philemon Dickinson was born at "Crosiadore," near Trappe, Maryland on April 5, 1739, a younger brother of Founding Father John Dickinson. When he was one, his family moved to Delaware. He was educated by a private tutor until he went to the University of Pennsylvania, from where he graduated in 1759. He then studied law, and was admitted to the bar, but never practiced. In 1767, Dickinson moved to Trenton to an estate called "The Hermitage". On July 14, 1767, he married his first cousin, Mary Cadwalader (1746–1781). They had two children; Samuel (1770–1837) and Mary (1768–1822).

== Military service ==
Dickinson served as an officer during the American Revolutionary War, rising to the rank of Major General in the New Jersey Militia.

At the beginning of the Revolutionary War in 1775 he was commissioned a colonel of the Hunterdon County militia. In 1776 he was elected as a delegate to New Jersey's Revolutionary provincial congress. Dickinson's Hunterdon militia led several successful attacks against British and Hessian forces in late 1776. On January 20, 1777, during the Battle of Millstone (also known as the Battle of Van Nest's Mill), Dickinson led 400 of his militia in a raid on a British foraging party near Somerset Court House, New Jersey, capturing about forty wagons of supplies and several prisoners. In June 1777 he was appointed major general in command of all New Jersey militia, a post he held throughout the rest of the war.

In November 1777 Dickinson led 1,400 men in a raid on Staten Island. While the attack was expected by Loyalist General Skinner and repulsed, Dickinson's party killed five and took 24 prisoners. Dickinson took several New Jersey Volunteers prisoner, including Lieutenant Jacob Van Buskirk, Lieutenant Edward Earle and Surgeon John Hammell.

Dickinson's militia took part in the Battle of Monmouth in 1778, helping obstruct the retreat of the British to New York. When his cousin John Cadwalader dueled General Thomas Conway on July 4, 1778, Dickinson was Cadwalader's second.

== Post Revolution Public Service ==
In 1782 and 1783, he represented Delaware at the Continental Congress. In 1783-84 he was elected to the New Jersey Legislative Council from Hunterdon County where he served as Vice-President of Council both years. He was a member of the commission that selected the site for the national capital in Washington, D.C., in 1784. When William Paterson resigned from the United States Senate, Dickinson was chosen by New Jersey to finish Paterson's term. He served in the senate from November 13, 1790, to March 3, 1793.

== Death ==
After his service in Congress, he returned to look after his estates until he died on February 4, 1809, at his home, and was buried at Friends Burying Ground in Trenton.

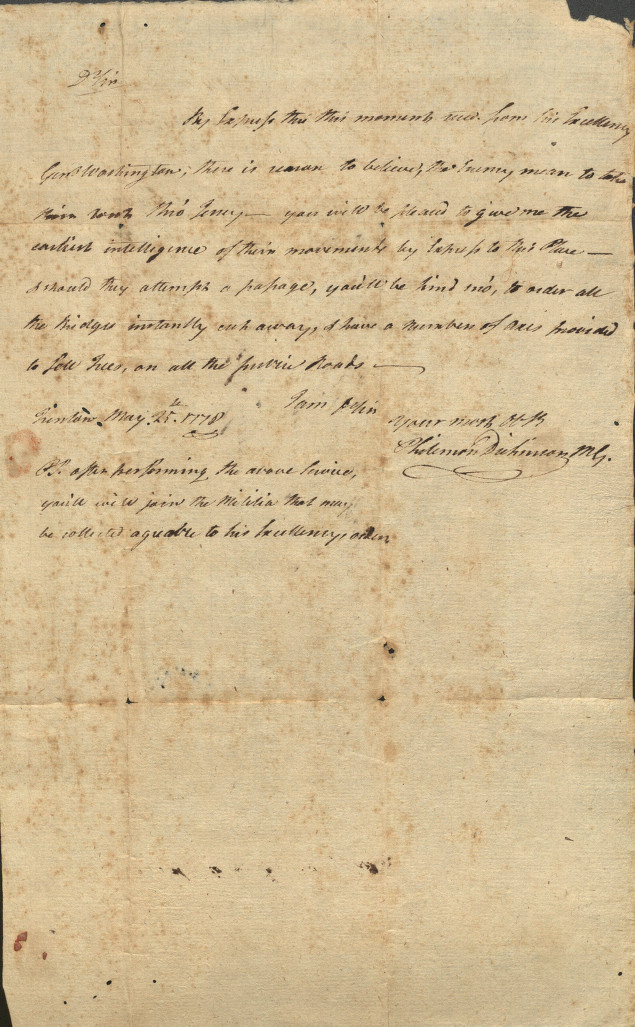
Letter from Philemon Dickinson, 1778

== Bibliography ==
- United States Congress. "Philemon Dickinson (id: D000324)". Biographical Directory of the United States Congress.

U.S. Senate
Preceded by William Paterson	U.S. senator (Class 2) from New Jersey; 1790–1793; Served alongside: Jonathan Elmer, John Rutherfurd	Succeeded by Frederick Frelinghuysen
