= Pluckemin Village Historic District =

Historic district in New Jersey, United States

- U.S. National Register of Historic Places
- U.S. Historic district
- New Jersey Register of Historic Places
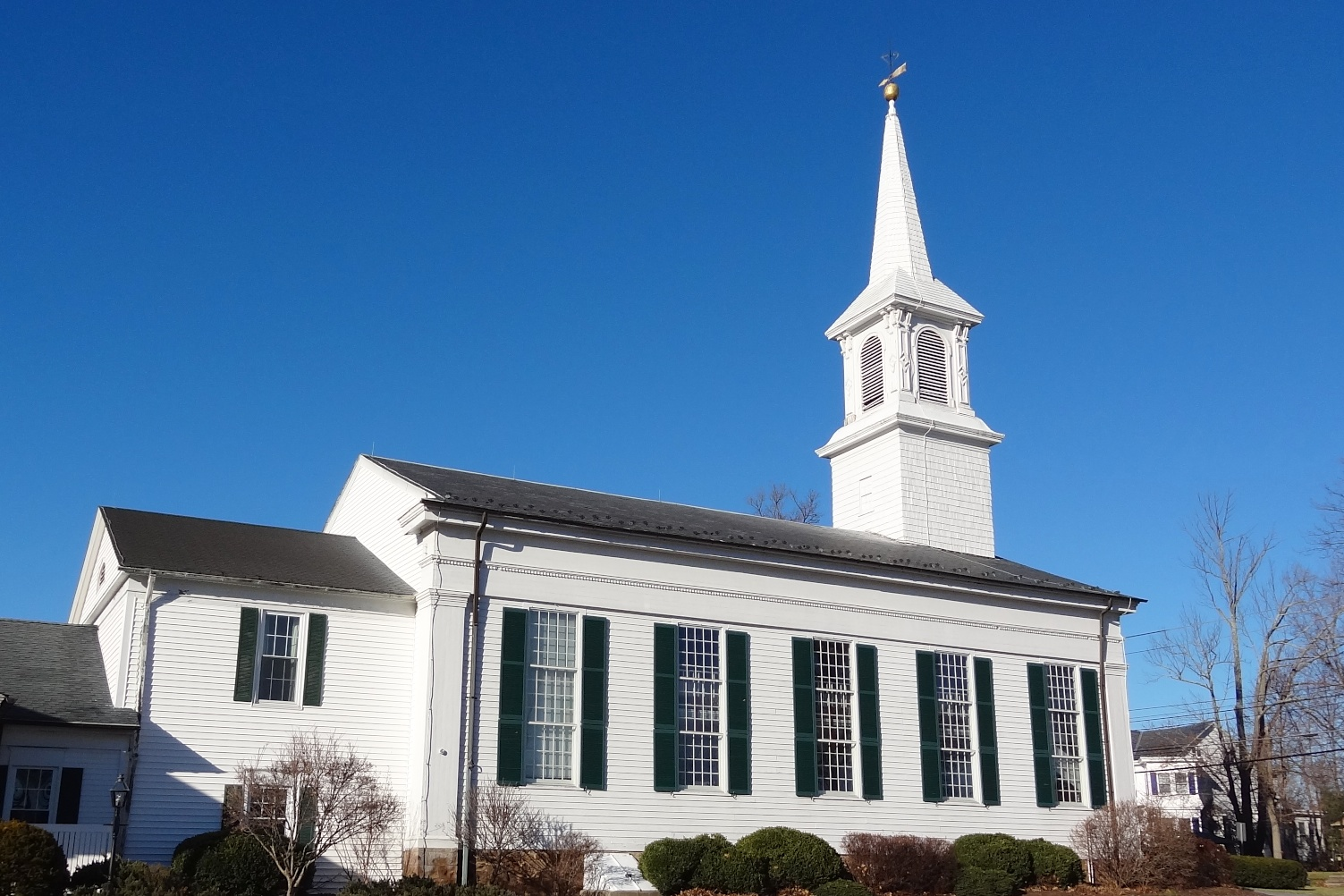
- Pluckemin Presbyterian Church

- Location within Somerset County, New Jersey Location within New Jersey Location within the United States
- Location: U.S. Route 206 and Burnt Mills Road; Bedminster, New Jersey
- Coordinates: 40°38′48″N 74°38′24″W
- Area: 43.5 acres (17.6 ha)
- Built: 1751
- Architectural style: Greek Revival, Italianate, Georgian
- NRHP reference No.: 82003303
- NJRHP No.: 2465

Significant dates
- Added to NRHP: July 26, 1982
- Designated NJRHP: February 22, 1982

The Pluckemin Village Historic District is a 43.5-acre (17.6 ha) historic district located along U.S. Route 206 and Burnt Mills Road in the Pluckemin section of Bedminster Township in Somerset County, New Jersey. The district was added to the National Register of Historic Places on July 26, 1982, for its significance in architecture, commerce, education, and religion. It includes 33 contributing buildings.

== Selected contributing properties ==
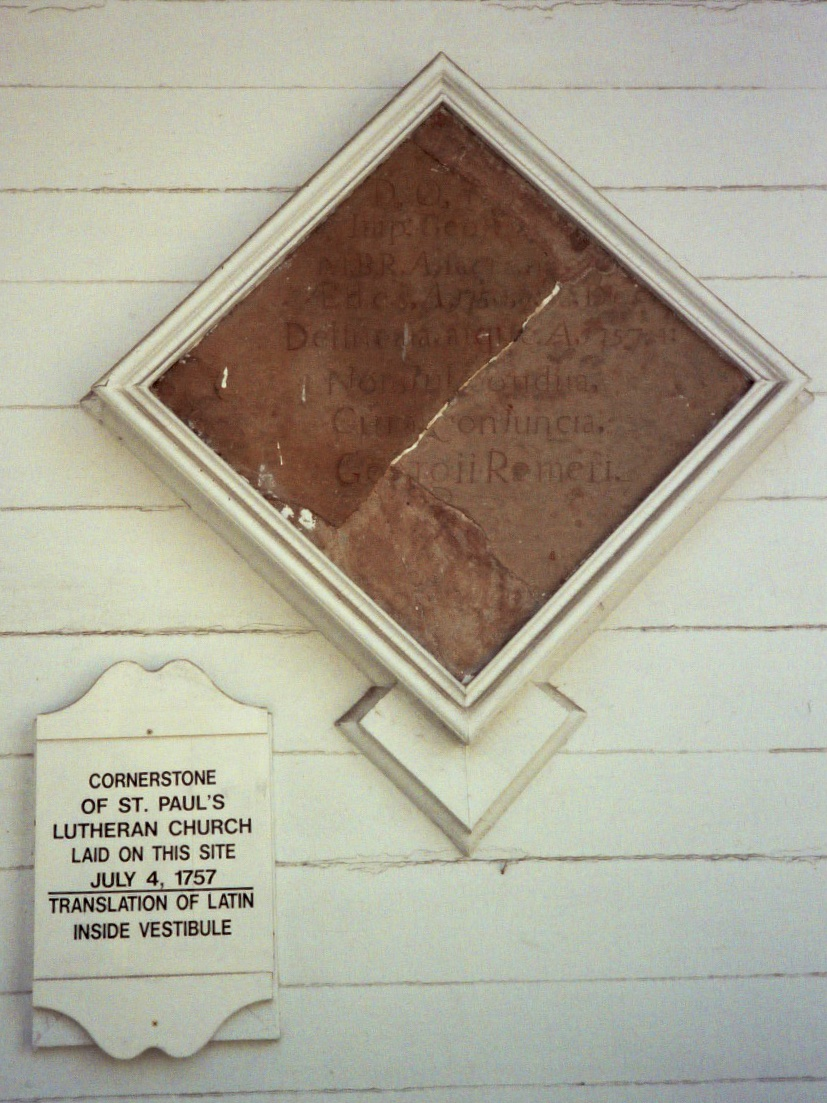
1757 Cornerstone of St. Paul's Lutheran Church, by entrance to Pluckemin Presbyterian Church

The Pluckemin Presbyterian Church complex is central to the district, rated pivotal. The church was built in 1851. It is located on the site of the former St. Paul's Lutheran Church built in 1757. British Captain William Leslie, who died during the Battle of Princeton on January 3, 1777, is buried in the graveyard of the former church.

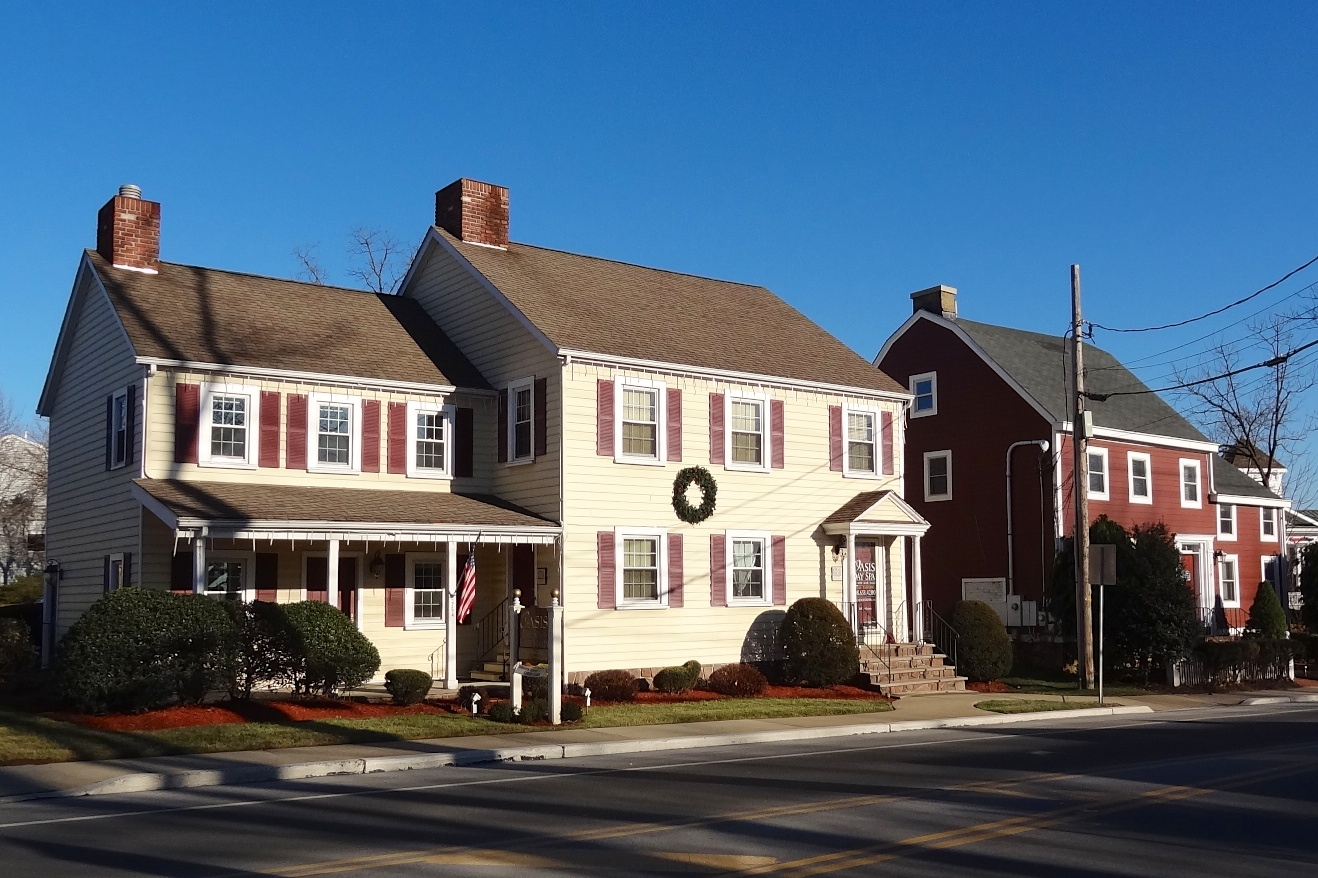
Three historic houses

The Daughaday House, Strupp House, and McKiernan House are pivotal contributions to the district.

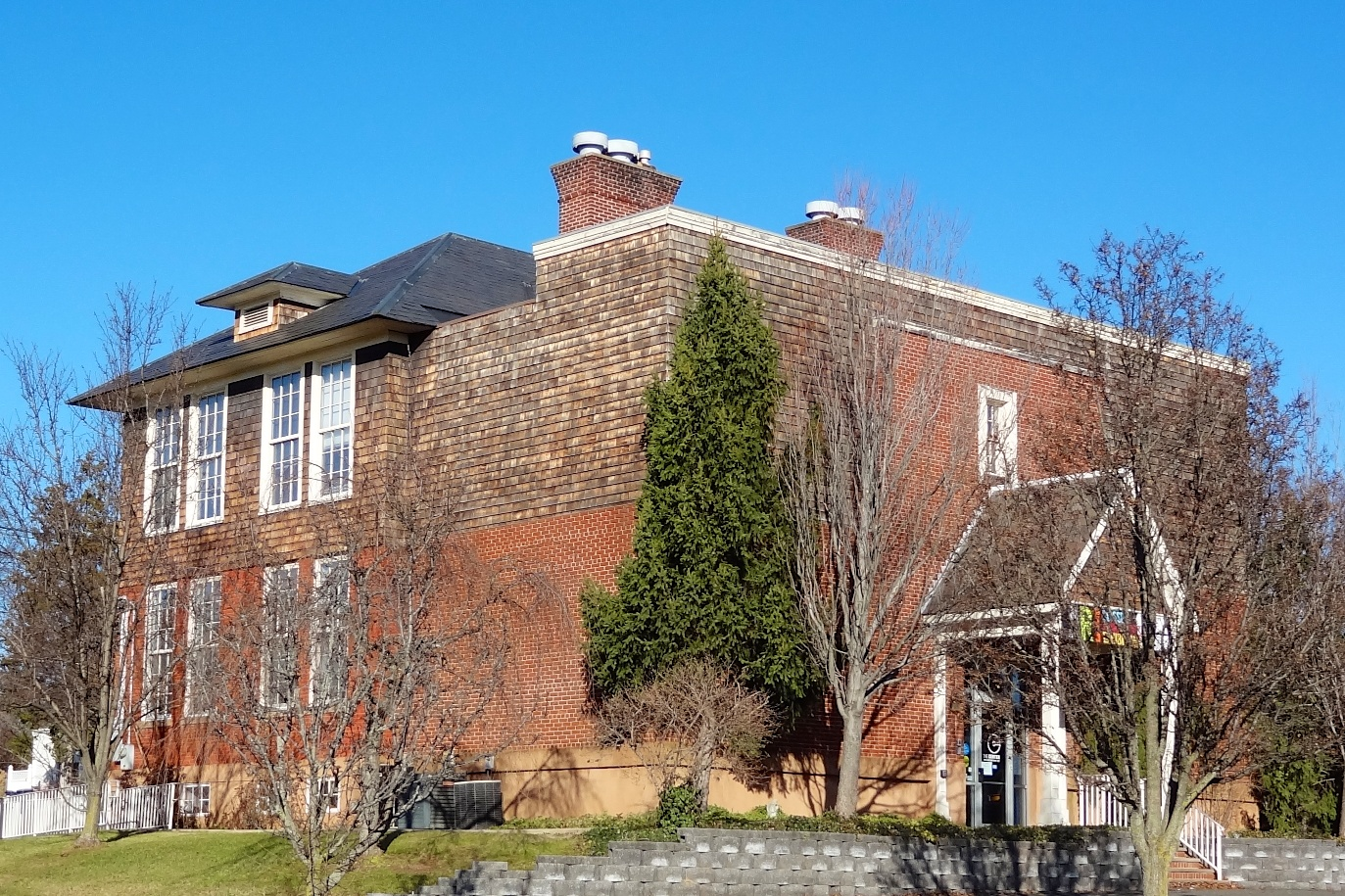
Center for Contemporary Art

The Center for Contemporary Art was once a former township building and school. The two-story four-room Pluckemin School House was built in 1912 and is rated a pivotal building in the district.

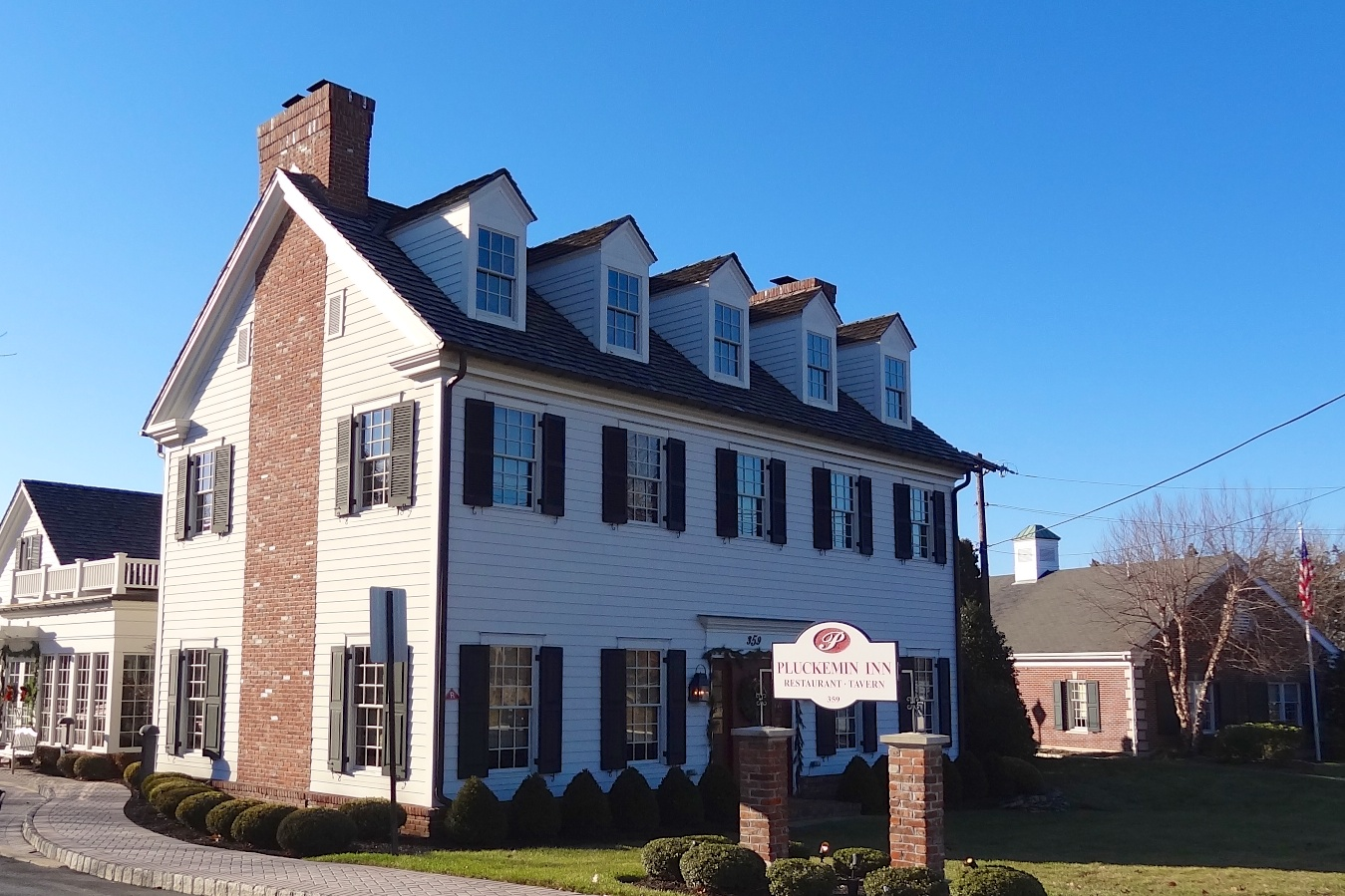
Pluckemin Inn

The Pluckemin Inn, a restaurant and wine cellar - opened in 2005 and was built on the site of the revolutionary-war era tavern also called the Pluckemin Inn. The tavern was a popular resting spot and refreshment choice for General Washington's continental army during the revolutionary war. The building was built in 2005 and modeled after a revolutionary-war era farm house and is often quoted as the restaurant is situated within a "revolutionary war farm house." It is a contributing building due to the site it's on rather than the building itself.

== See also ==
- National Register of Historic Places listings in Somerset County, New Jersey
