= The Capture of the Hessians at Trenton, December 26, 1776 =

Painting by John Trumbull, completed in 1828

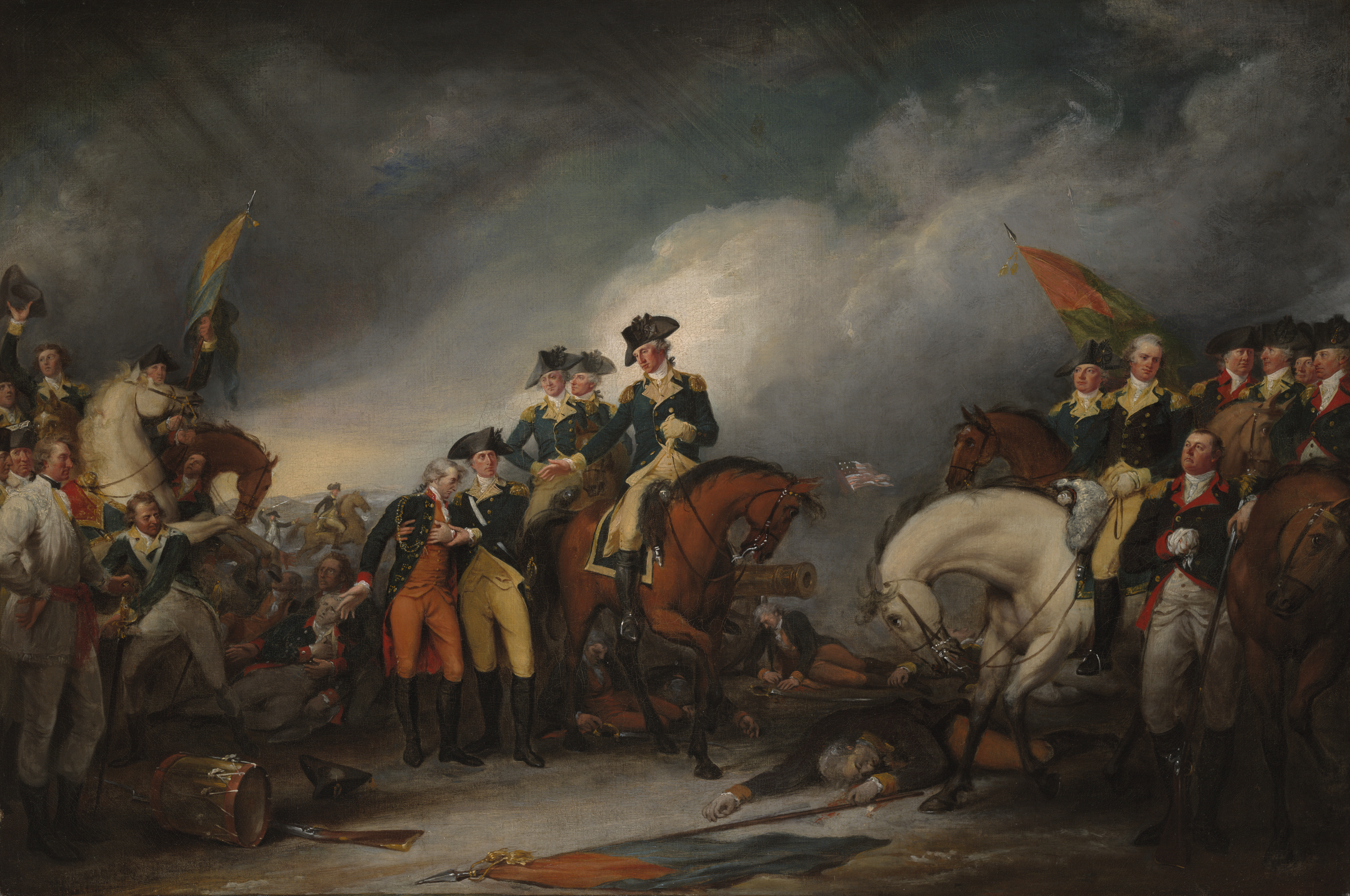
- Artist: John Trumbull
- Year: 1786–1828
- Medium: oil on canvas
- Dimensions: 51.1 cm × 76.2 cm (20.125 in × 30 in)
- Location: Yale University Art Gallery, New Haven, Connecticut

The Capture of the Hessians at Trenton, December 26, 1776 is the title of an oil painting by the American artist John Trumbull depicting the capture of the Hessian soldiers at the Battle of Trenton on the morning of Thursday, December 26, 1776, during the American Revolutionary War. The focus is on General George Washington aiding the mortally wounded Hessian Colonel Johann Gottlieb Rall. Nearly 900 Hessians were captured at the battle. It is one of Trumbull's series of historical paintings on the war, which also includes the Declaration of Independence and The Death of General Mercer at the Battle of Princeton, January 3, 1777. The painting is on view at the Yale University Art Gallery in New Haven, Connecticut.

The artist intended to show the compassion of General George Washington in this painting, as he wrote in the catalogue for his exhibited works at Yale University in 1835:

The magnanimous kindness displayed by Washington, on this occasion, offers a sublime example of true heroism, and well deserves to be imitated by all military men. The artist chose this subject, and composed the picture, for the express purpose of giving a lesson to all living and future soldiers in the service of his country, to show mercy and kindness to a fallen enemy,–their enemy no longer when wounded and in their power.

— John Trumbull

== History ==
Starting in 1775, Trumbull himself served in the war, having been appointed second aide-de-camp to Washington. He later resigned from the army in 1777. The study for this painting was begun in London in November, 1786. In the study, Washington enters from the left to order that Rall, upheld by two officers, be cared for respectfully. Trumbull returned to New York on November 26, 1789, to continue work on the painting by making portraits of Washington. He continued making changes on the painting until its completion in 1828.

== Description ==
In the center of the painting, American General George Washington is focusing his attention on the needs of the mortally wounded Hessian Colonel Johann Gottlieb Rall. Rall is being helped by American Major William Stephens Smith, aide-de-camp to General John Sullivan. Washington orders Smith to "call our best surgeons to his assistance, and let us save his life if possible." During the battle, Rall had been shot twice and needed to be carried into his headquarters, where he died that night. Behind Washington, on horseback, are his aides, Colonel Robert Hanson Harrison and Captain Tench Tilghman.

To the left and behind Rall, severely wounded American Lieutenant James Monroe is attended to by Dr. John Riker. He saved Monroe's life by quickly clamping the damaged artery to stop the heavy bleeding. On the far left, dressed in white, is American Colonel Josiah Parker. He had the honor to receive Rall's sword of surrender and he alone holds a sword in the painting. Next to him are Colonels Edward Wigglesworth and William Shepard.

American Major General Nathanael Greene is shown on the right on a light-colored horse, facing Washington. Behind Greene are American Generals John Sullivan, Henry Knox, Philemon Dickinson, John Glover, and George Weedon. Standing to the right of Greene is Captain William Washington, who was wounded in his hand during the battle.

In the foreground, a fallen Hessian flag is shown. Washington was later presented one as a war trophy.

== Other versions ==
A large scale version (72 1/4 inches (184 cm) × 108 inches (270 cm)), finished in 1831, is owned by the Wadsworth Atheneum in Hartford, Connecticut.

== Critical reception ==
Trumbull did not use the prelude to the capture, namely the crossing of the Delaware River, as a subject. Artists did not paint that until 1819 by Thomas Sully and then notably by Emanuel Leutze. Trumbull's work drew criticism from historian and painter William Dunlap after he viewed it in the Trumbull Gallery at Yale in 1834:

All that is good in this picture was painted in 1789 and shortly after. What is good is very good, but unfortunately the artist undertook, in after life, to finish it, and every touch is a blot.

== Gallery ==
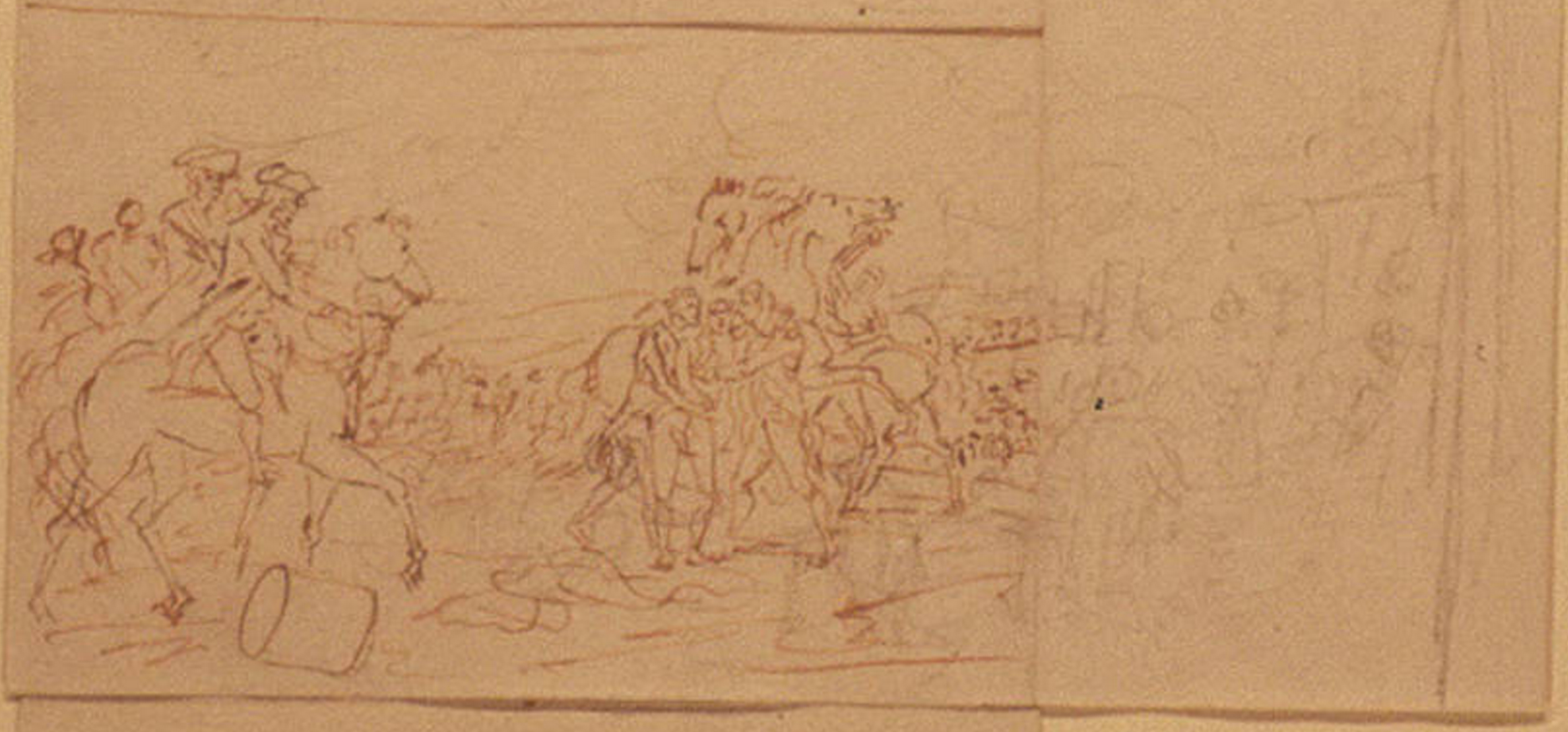
Study for painting, 1787–88

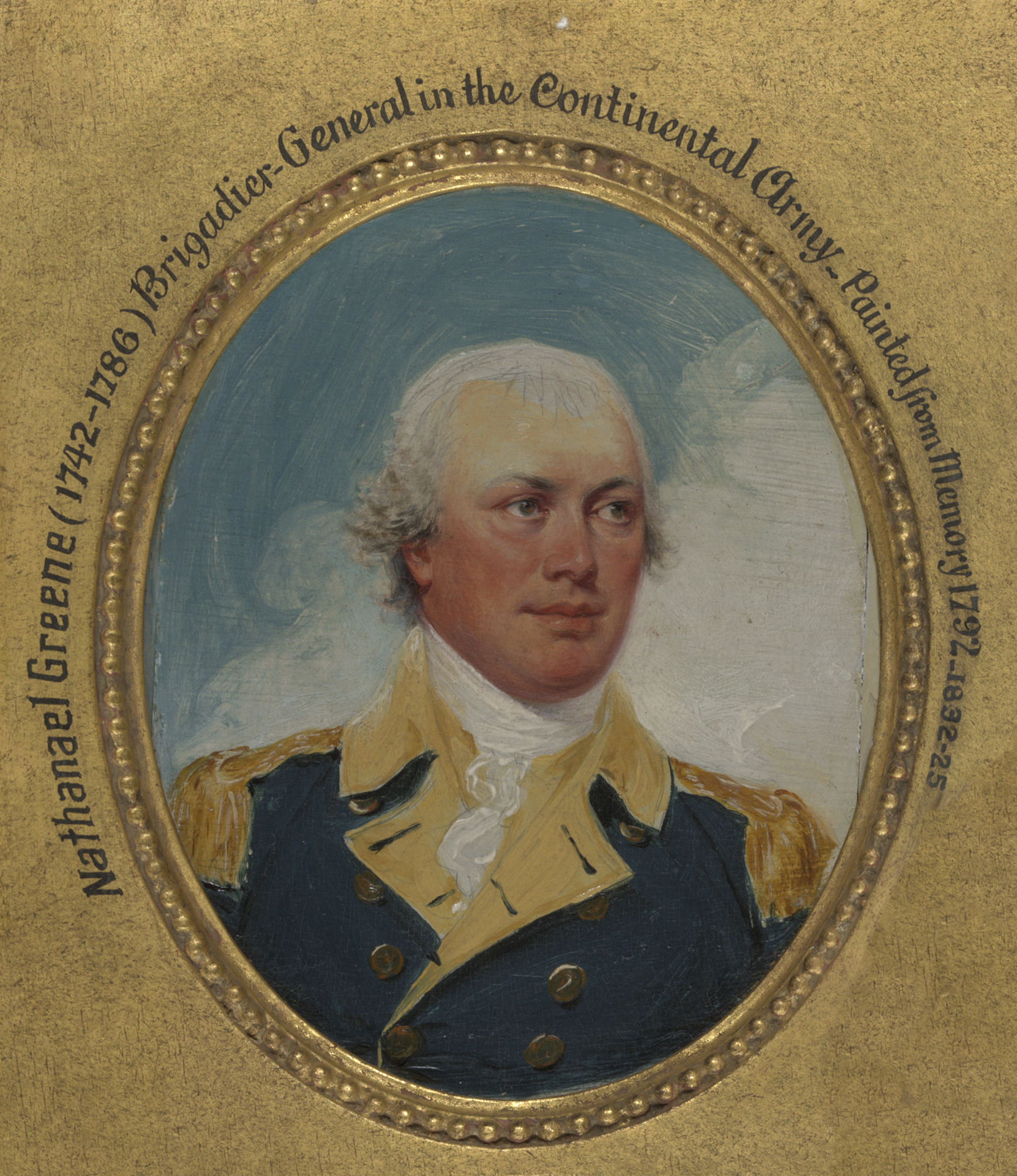
Nathanael Greene, by John Trumbull, 1792

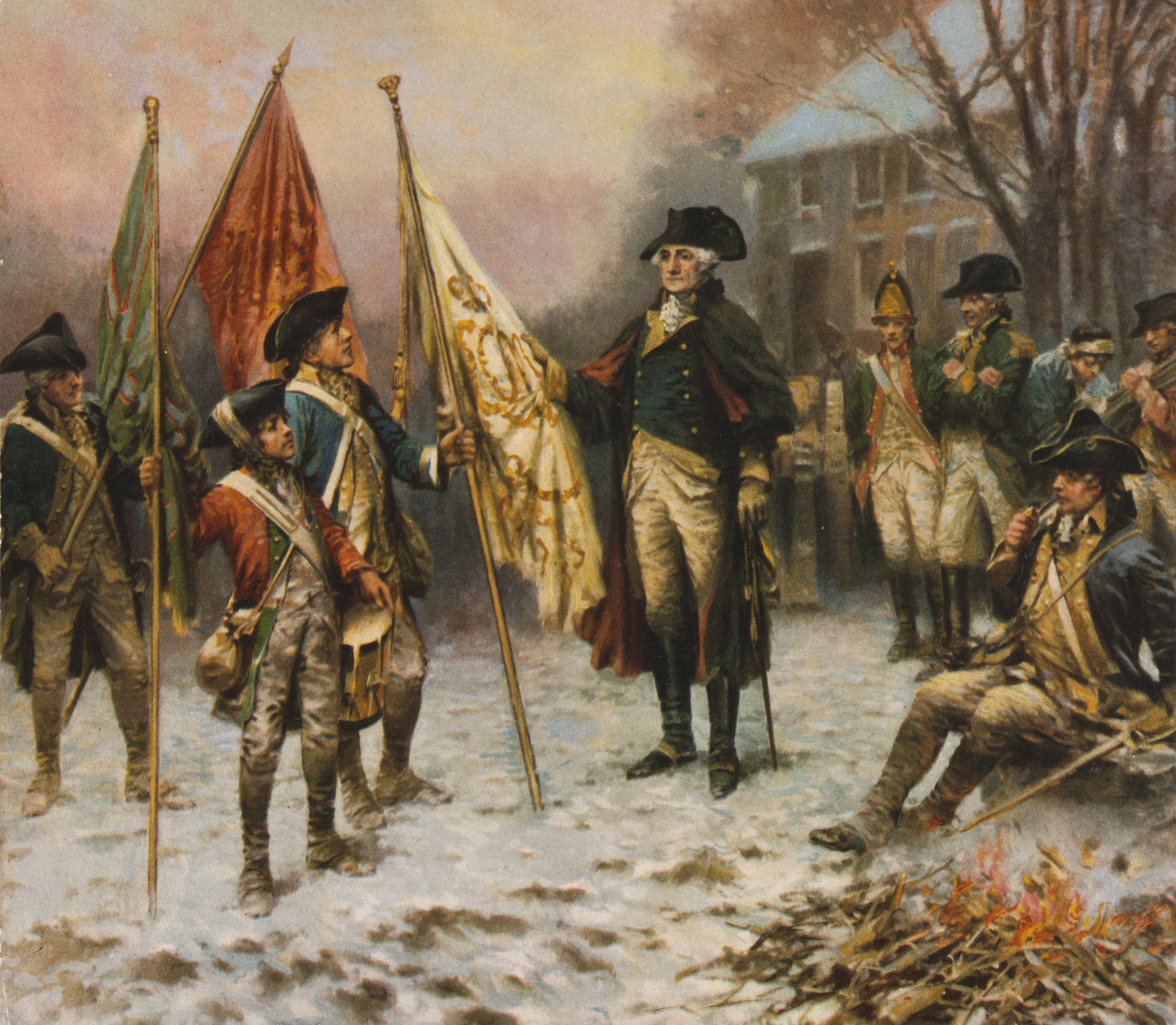
Washington inspecting the captured colors after the Battle of Trenton, by Edward Percy Moran, c. 1914

== See also ==
- General George Washington at Trenton – Portrait after the Second Battle of Trenton and before the Battle of Princeton
- Battle of Princeton
