= The Death of General Mercer at the Battle of Princeton, January 3, 1777 =

Painting by John Trumbull

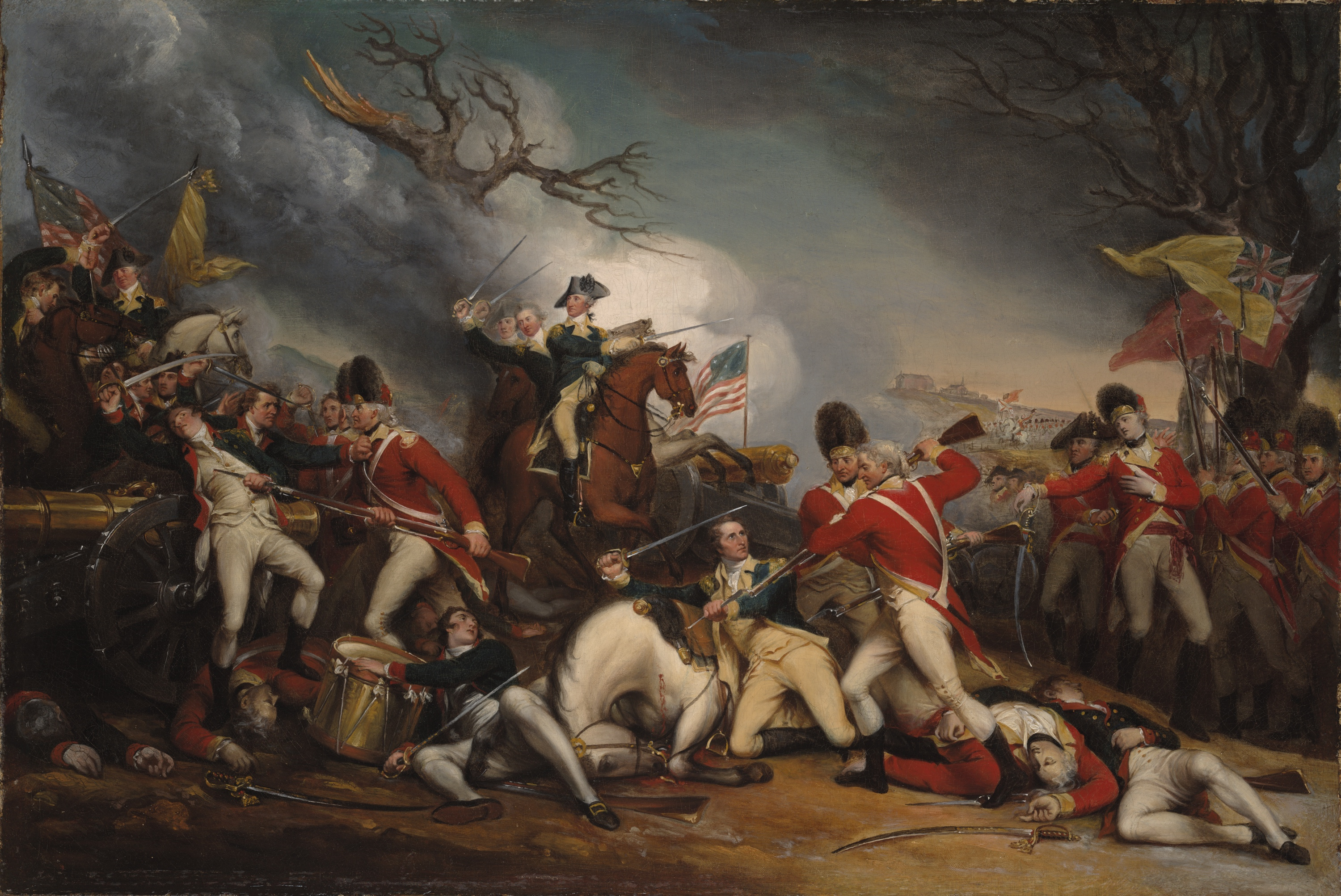
- Artist: John Trumbull
- Year: c. 1787–c. 1831
- Medium: oil on canvas
- Dimensions: 51.1 cm × 75.9 cm (20.125 in × 29.875 in)
- Location: Yale University Art Gallery, New Haven, Connecticut

The Death of General Mercer at the Battle of Princeton, January 3, 1777 is the title of an oil painting by the American artist John Trumbull depicting the death of the American General Hugh Mercer at the Battle of Princeton on Friday, January 3, 1777, during the American Revolutionary War. The painting was Trumbull’s first depiction of an American war victory. It is one of a series of historical paintings on the war, which also includes the Declaration of Independence and The Capture of the Hessians at Trenton, December 26, 1776.

The artist expressed his great admiration for General George Washington in this painting as he wrote in the catalogue for his exhibited works at Yale University in 1835:

Thus, in the short space of nine days, an extensive country, an entire State, was wrested from the hands of a victorious enemy, superior in numbers, in arms and in discipline, by the wisdom, activity and energy of one great mind.

The work was a personal favorite of Trumbull himself. When asked by Benjamin Silliman which paintings he would save from destruction in the Trumbull Gallery at Yale, he named this one.

Trumbull used the General's son, Hugh Jr., as a model for the painting.

== Description ==
The picture displays several different events of the battle as if they occurred simultaneously.

At the center, American General Hugh Mercer, with his dead horse beneath him, is shown mortally wounded. Mercer was commanding the leading division of the Continental Army when attacked by British Lieutenant-Colonel Charles Mawhood near Princeton, New Jersey. Mercer's horse was killed and he was attacked by two grenadiers. The British were in control of the battle at this moment. Mercer would be treated for his wounds by Dr. Benjamin Rush the next day, January 4, but died on January 12 as a result, Dr. Rush believed, of a concussion caused by a musket butt to the head

At the left, American Daniel Neil (Note: misidentified by art historians as American Lieutenant Charles Turnbull) is shown bayoneted against his cannon. Capt. Daniel Neil was the Captain of Artillery and began his service in the Revolutionary War as Captain-Lieutenant in the East New Jersey Artillery in Knox's Battalion March 1st, 1776. He was appointed Capt on May, 9th 1776. Captain Neil died on the battlefield after receiving a number of saber wounds from the British.

At the right, British Captain William Leslie is shown mortally wounded. Leslie died during the battle and was put on a wagon by the British that was later taken by the Americans. Rush also learned of his death on January 4. He would be buried at Pluckemin, New Jersey the next day, January 5.

In the background, American General George Washington and Dr. Benjamin Rush enter the scene. After Mercer became a casualty, Washington needed to lead the charge to overtake Mawhood's troops and win the battle. On the far left, American General Thomas Mifflin is shown leading a cavalry charge. American Colonel John Cadwalader and British Colonel Edmund Eyre are also depicted.

== Other versions ==
Trumbull worked on this painting for many years and created several sketches and final oil paintings. A collection of sketches is located at the Princeton University Library.

A large scale version (72 1/4 inches (184 cm) x 108 inches (270 cm)), painted in 1831, is owned by the Wadsworth Atheneum in Hartford, Connecticut.

The Yale University Art Gallery also owns an unfinished version titled The Death of General Mercer at the Battle of Princeton, 3 January 1777 and dated c. 1786–c. 1788.

== Gallery ==
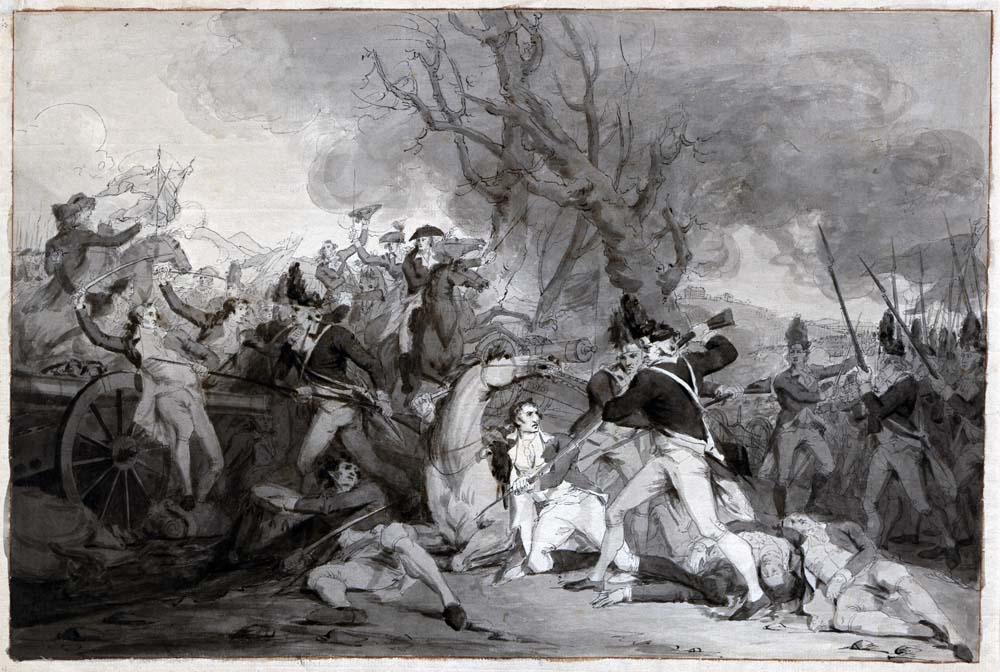
Pen and ink wash sketch, 1786

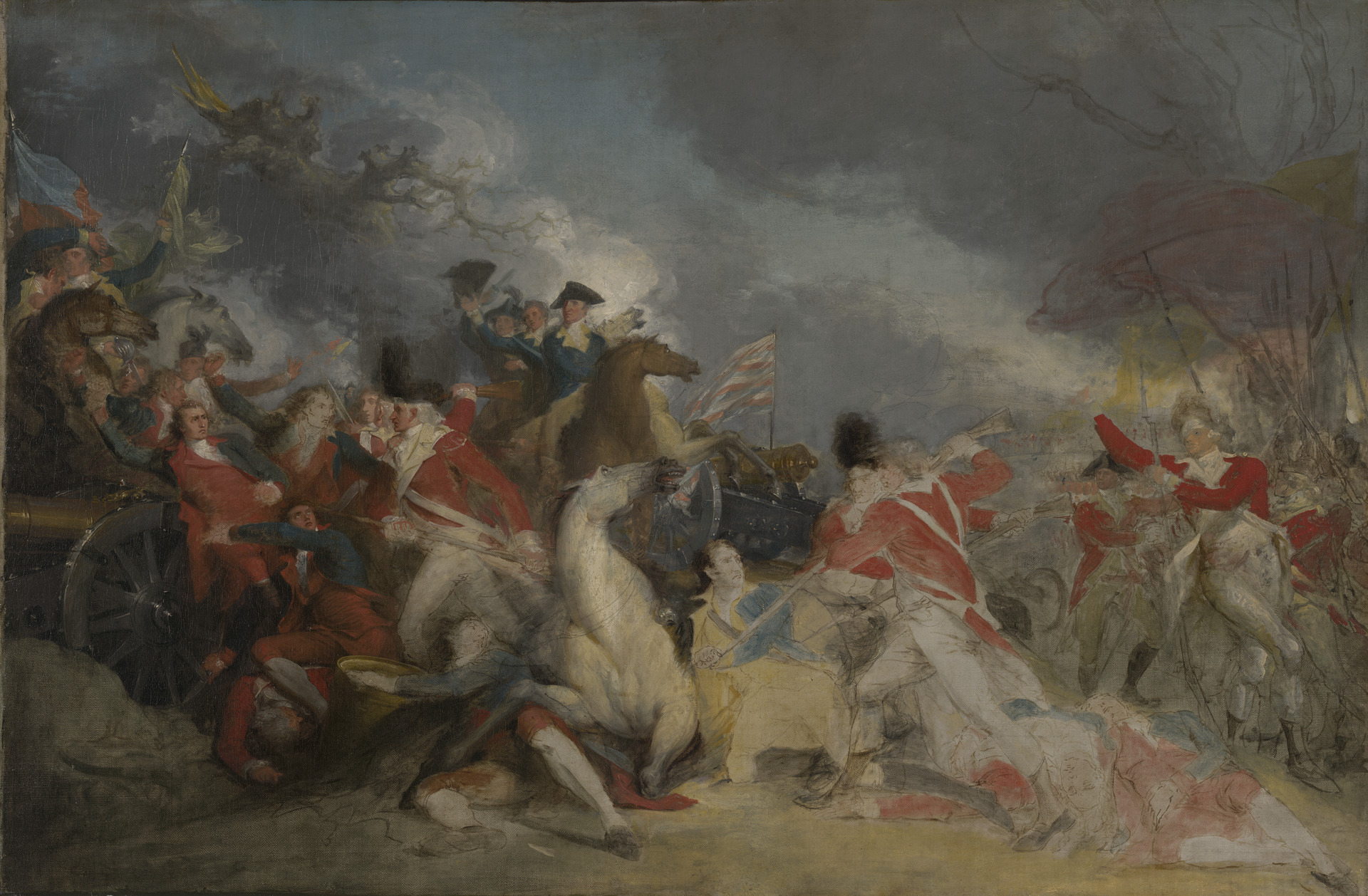
Unfinished version, c. 1786–c. 1788

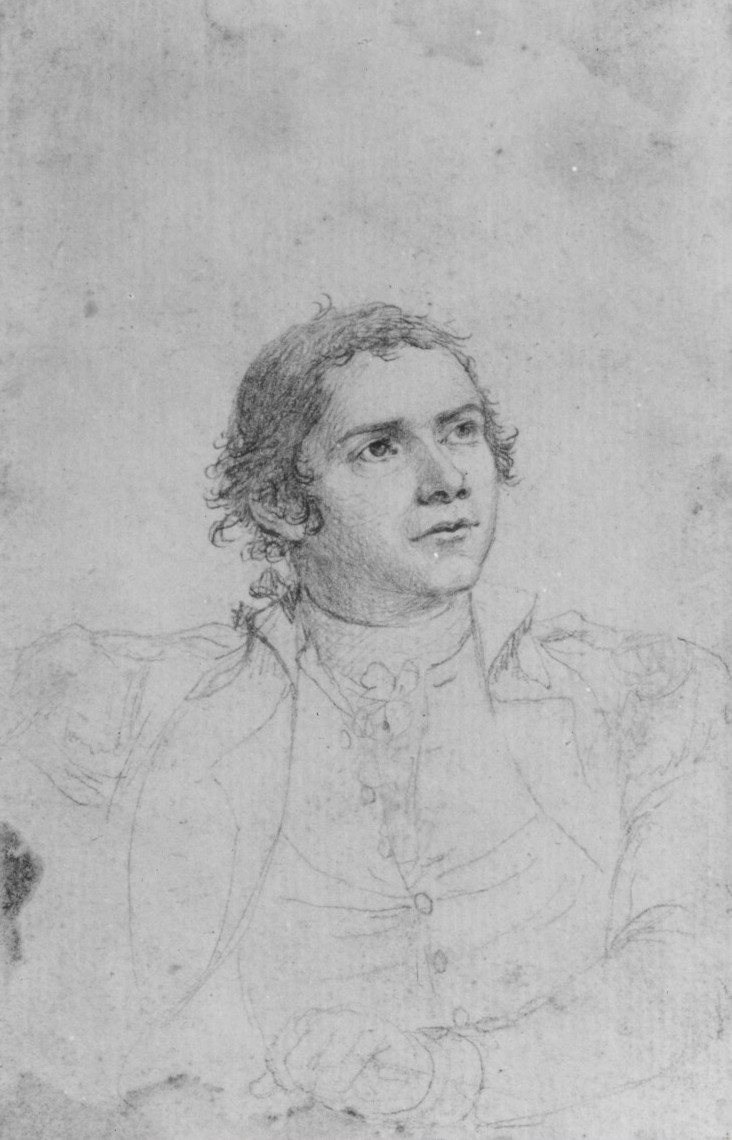
Hugh Mercer, Jr., sketch, 1791

== See also ==
- List of paintings of George Washington
- Battle of Trenton
