= Charles Mawhood =

British Army officer

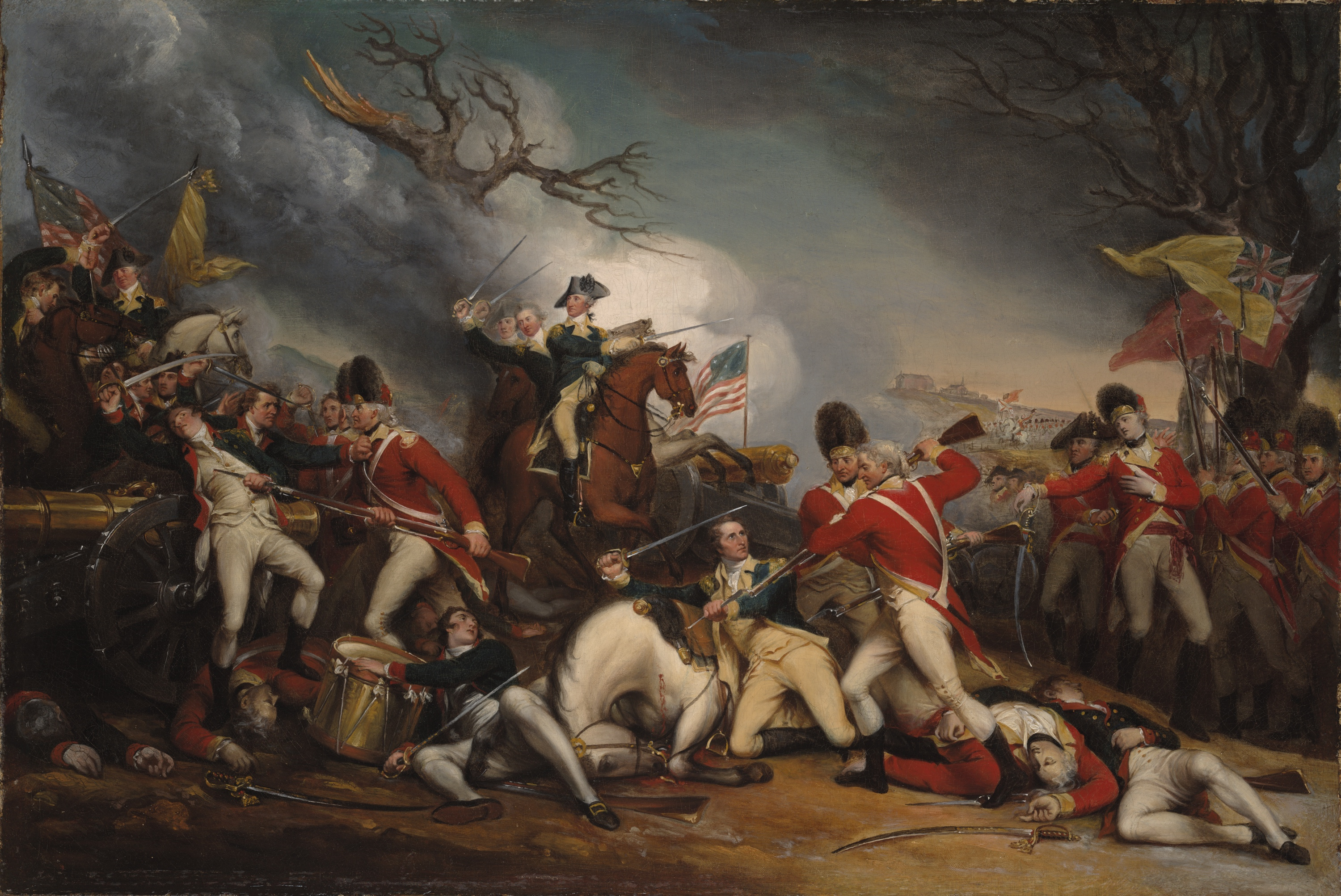
- The Death of General Mercer at the Battle of Princeton, January 3, 1777 by John Trumbull
- Born: 23 December 1729
- Died: 29 August 1780 (aged 50) Gibraltar
- Allegiance: Great Britain
- Branch: British Army
- Service years: 1752–1780
- Rank: Lieutenant-Colonel
- Conflicts: Seven Years' War; American War of Independence; New York and New Jersey Campaign; Philadelphia Campaign; Great Siege of Gibraltar

Lieutenant-Colonel Charles Mawhood (23 December 1729 – 29 August 1780) was a British Army officer who served in the American War of Independence. He is most noted for his command during the Battle of Princeton.

== Military career ==
His military service began with purchase of a cornetcy in 1st Dragoon Guards (1 August 1752). He served in the Seven Years' War (1756–1763), initially as a Captain in the 15th Light Dragoons, then transferred to 18th Light Dragoons. He subsequently saw action in Germany as aide-de-camp to Lord Granby. He continued to rise in rank during the peace, first to major in the 3rd Foot on 17 May 1763, then to lieutenant colonel of the 19th Foot on 17 June 1767. He transferred to the 17th Foot on 26 October 1775 (Note: Howe's Orders, Boston, 4th Apr., 1776. “17th. Regiment.—Lieutenant-Colonel Mawhood, of the 19th. Regiment, to be Lieutenant-Colonel Vice Derby 26th. Oct., 1775.”.) and served with this regiment during General Howe's early campaigns of the American War of Independence.

=== Battle of Princeton ===
Mawhood was left in command of a force at Princeton, New Jersey by Lord Cornwallis in January 1777 while Cornwallis chased after George Washington's army after the Battle of Trenton. After Cornwallis's attack in Trenton was stopped, Washington sneaked his army around that of Cornwallis and attacked the Princeton garrison. Despite some early success in checking the American advance and the killing of his opposite, the highly popular Hugh Mercer; Mawhood's post was overrun and the battle was lost after Washington brought forward reinforcements. It is generally considered that Mawhood personally acquitted himself well in the defeat. He broke through Washington's attempted encirclement by leading a bayonet charge across a bridge, in doing so he managed to escape with most of his force, averting an ignominious fate like that suffered by Colonel Rall the week prior in similar circumstances. Howe later praised Mawhood in dispatches about the engagement: (Note: “HEAD QUARTERS, New York, Jan. 8th., 1777.”)

“General Howe desires Lieut.-Col. Mawhood will accept his thanks for his Gallantry and good Conduct in the Attack [...] He desires his thanks may also be given to the Officers and Soldiers of the 17th. Foot, to part of the 55th. Regiment, and other Detachments on their march, who on that occasion supported the 17th. Regiment and Charged the Enemy with Bayonet in the most Spirited manner.”

Later, Mawhood received a message from the King, noting his bravery.

Mawhood continued to serve in North America, seeing further action during the 1777–1778 Philadelphia campaign leading a mixed force of regulars, loyalists and rangers in a series of raids through New Jersey. In 1778 Mawhood's mixed force ambushed an American force of militia at the Battle of Quinton's Bridge.

=== Gibraltar ===
With the advent of war with France and Howe's resignation as commander in chief, Mawhood played no further part in the war in North America and returned to England. Mawhood's colonelcy was transferred to one of the newly raised volunteer regiments which had been quickly raised in response to the advent of war with France. In 1778 the Royal Manchester Volunteers (72nd Foot) were raised by public subscription by the City of Manchester and deployed to the garrison of Gibraltar. In 1780 Mawhood was chosen to lead reinforcements to the besieged garrison, arriving with the fleet of Admiral George Rodney which broke through the French blockade in January. Mawhood died during the siege on 29 August 1780 after suffering from a gall-stone.

== Bibliography ==
- Fischer, David Hackett (2006). Washington's Crossing. Oxford University Press. ISBN 0-19-518159-X.
- Kemble, Stephen (1884). Kemble Papers: Volume 1. Kemble's journals, 1773-1789 -- British Army orders : Gen. Sir William Howe, 1775-1778; Gen. Sir Henry Clinton, 1778; Gen. Daniel Jones, 1778. New York Historical Society.
