= Battle of Quinton's Bridge =

1778 battle of the American Revolutionary War

Coordinates: 39.548485°N 75.414366°W

- Part of the American Revolutionary War
Date	March 18, 1778
Location	present-day Quinton Township, New Jersey
Result	British victory

Belligerents
United States	Great Britain

Commanders and leaders
(United States) Benjamin Holme	(Kingdom of Great Britain) Charles Mawhood (Kingdom of Great Britain) John Graves Simcoe

Strength
300	1,200

Casualties and losses
30–40 killed, wounded and missing	1 wounded

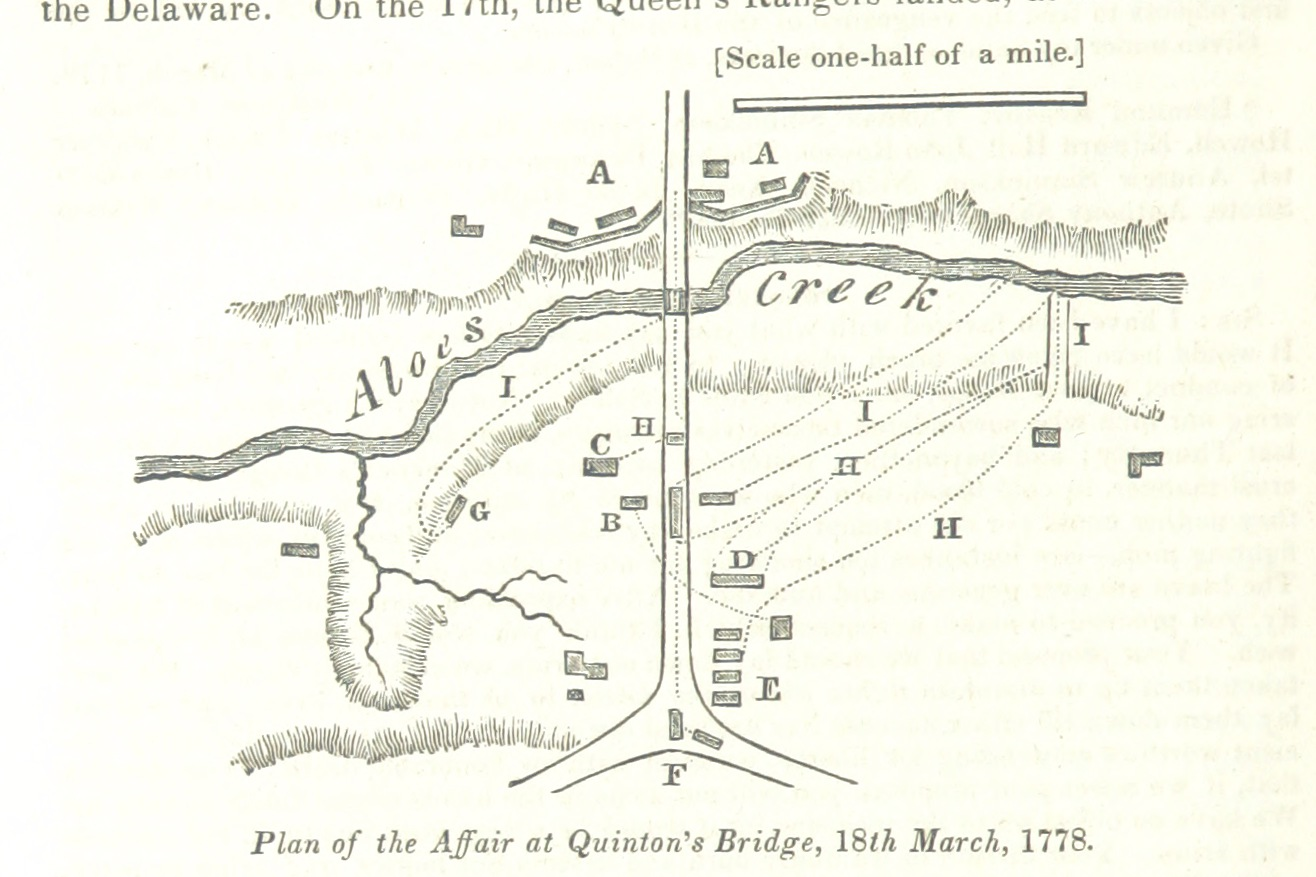
A map detailing the troop placements during the battle.

The Battle of Quinton's Bridge was a minor battle of the American Revolutionary War fought on March 18, 1778, during the British occupation of Philadelphia. New Jersey militia companies defending a bridge across Alloway Creek in Salem County, New Jersey, were lured into a trap by British Lieutenant Colonel Charles Mawhood and suffered significant casualties.

== Background ==
In late 1777, British forces under the command of General William Howe occupied Philadelphia, the seat of the Second Continental Congress, and viewed by Howe as the capital of the rebellious Thirteen Colonies. The occupation was not an easy one, as the surrounding countryside swarmed with Continental Army and Patriot militia companies as part of a campaign by George Washington against British supply lines. The winter of 1777–1778 was particularly harsh for the Americans, but both sides regularly sent out significant forces to forage for their own side and to interfere with the foraging operations of the other side.

On February 19, with the Continental Army in desperate need of provisions, Brigadier General Anthony Wayne led a force across the Delaware River south of Philadelphia on a foraging expedition through southern New Jersey. General Howe responded by sending a force of about 4,000 men to harass Wayne. However, Wayne moved rapidly northward, gathering provisions, forcing residents to move supplies he could not take away from easy British reach, and occasionally skirmishing with the chasing British. Howe sent another force in March under Lieutenant Colonel Charles Mawhood to forage and also to try to force Wayne into battle. On March 17, Mawhood led a mixed force of 1,200 men, consisting of British regulars and Loyalist companies of New Jersey Volunteers and John Graves Simcoe's Queen's Rangers, across the Delaware River into Salem County, New Jersey. General Wayne, alert to British movements, had largely completed his work and was in Burlington, preparing to return to Valley Forge.

Alloway Creek in Salem County formed a natural line of defense, and the local militia, after learning of the British movement, established strong defensive positions at the two crossings nearest the Delaware, Quinton's Bridge and Hancock's Bridge, to prevent the British from crossing. Mawhood led his force to Salem, where they were met by some local Loyalists who told them that Colonel Benjamin Holme, along with 300 militia, was at Quinton's Bridge, only three miles (4.8 km) to the southeast. Holme had established his position on the north side of the bridge, and had taken up the bridge's planking to prevent its easy use.

== Battle ==
Before dawn on March 18, Mawhood moved several detachments of men into position on the side of the creek opposite the American forces. He then displayed a portion of his force moving away from the bridge, as if to retreat. As soon as the Americans saw this movement, Captain William Smith replaced the planks and gave chase with 200 of the 300 men guarding the bridge. This force followed the British further along the road, eventually making contact with another group of soldiers that had been posted behind a rail fence. The remainder of the British force was nearby, posted in a house by the fence.

When Smith and his men were attacked, the soldiers posted in the house slipped out and ran to the Americans' rear, cutting off any retreat to the bridge. They then forced Smith's force to attempt another crossing of the creek. At this point the main body of British soldiers arrived at the bridge and attempted to cross over to the American position. They were stopped by Colonel Elijah Hand and his militia, who arrived with two guns in time to stop a complete annihilation of the American force. In the event, the Americans lost between 30 and 40 men in the engagement, most to drowning.

== Aftermath ==
Although the force at Quinton's Bridge had taken significant casualties, Hand and his men stayed to reinforce the position. Mawhood attempted to force the militia to retire the next day, but they were well-positioned and could not be dislodged. Mawhood then detached Major Simcoe and his rangers to attack the position at Hancock's Bridge. Simcoe and his men returned to the Delaware, and maneuvered downstream to reach the south side of the creek. From there they marched, according to Simcoe's account through difficult terrain, to the southern end of Hancock's Bridge. There they completely surprised 20 to 30 men stationed in the house of local judge William Hancock, putting them all to the bayonet. Although they had not intended to kill Hancock, Simcoe's intelligence had reported that Hancock had abandoned the house when it was occupied by the militia; in fact he had returned home the evening before, and was among those slain.

Mawhood then sent a letter to Hand, warning him that if the militia did not put down their arms, he would "attack the militia wearing arms, burn their houses, and reduce them, their unfortunate wives, and their children to beggary and distress." Hand refused to surrender, writing in his response that "[y]our threat to burn and destroy, induces me to imagine that I am reading the orders of a barbarous Attila, and not of a gentleman, brave, generous, and polished."

Wayne's expedition through southern New Jersey heightened tensions between General Washington and New Jersey officials, since the state had largely been left to its own defenses during the winter. The British response to Wayne's movements led New Jersey officials to demand a Continental Army presence in the region. One week after Wayne's departure, Washington sent a small detachment of Continentals into southern New Jersey, but it was wholly ineffective at preventing the crumbling of southern New Jersey militia organizations.
