= 72nd Regiment of Foot (Royal Manchester Volunteers) =

- Active: 1777 – 1783
- Country: Kingdom of Great Britain (1707–1800)
- Branch: British Army
- Type: Infantry

The 72nd Regiment of Foot (Royal Manchester Volunteers) was a regiment in the British Army from 1777 to 1783.

It was formed on 16 December 1777 by public subscription in the City of Manchester to serve on garrison duty in Gibraltar during the American War of Independence. There they took part in the Great Siege of Gibraltar which lasted from June 1779 to February 1783, when French and Spanish forces unsuccessfully attempted to capture Gibraltar from English control.

They were disbanded in 1783 on their return to Manchester following the Treaty of Paris (1783).

== Regimental Colonels ==
- 1777–1780: Col. Charles Mawhood
- 1781–1783: Maj-Gen. Charles Ross
