= William Leslie (British Army officer) =

British army officer (1751–1777)

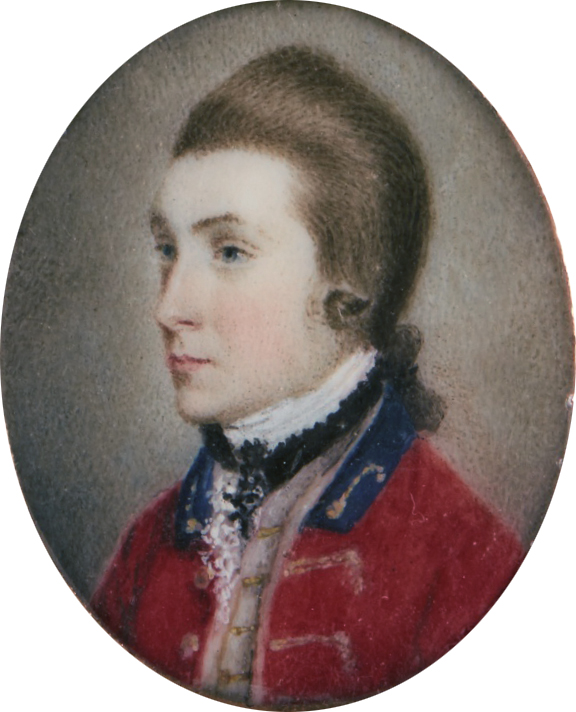
- Miniature portrait, c. 1780
- Born: 8 August 1751; Fife, Scotland
- Died: 3 January 1777 (aged 25); Princeton, New Jersey, United States
- Burial place: St. Paul's Lutheran Church graveyard Pluckemin, New Jersey, United States
- Military career
- Allegiance: Great Britain
- Branch: British Army
- Rank: Captain
- Conflicts: American War of Independence: Battle of Long Island; Battle of Fort Washington; Battle of Princeton †

The Honourable William Leslie (8 August 1751 – 3 January 1777) was a British nobleman and soldier. He was the second son of the Earl of Leven and Melville from Scotland and a captain in the 17th Foot of the British Army during the American War of Independence. He was mortally wounded during the Battle of Princeton and buried with military honours by American General George Washington at Pluckemin, New Jersey.

== Early life ==
Leslie was born on 8 August 1751 to David Leslie, 6th Earl of Leven and Wilhelmina Nisbet. He was the nephew of General Alexander Leslie.

During the summer of 1767, he became a friend of Benjamin Rush, who was then studying medicine at University of Edinburgh and had visited the estate of the Earl of Leven.

== Military career ==
In 1771, he joined the 42nd Highlanders; then switched to the 17th Foot and was promoted to lieutenant in 1773, and to captain in 1776. Sent to America in 1776, he served in the Battle of Long Island and the Battle of Fort Washington.

Leslie was one of many who died during the Battle of Princeton on 3 January 1777. According to Lieutenant William Armstrong of the 17th Regiment, Leslie "fell in the first fire." Surgeon Andrew Wardrop, also of the 17th, stated that "no sooner [he'd] received the shots than he instantly expired without a groan." The British put his body in a wagon that was later taken by the Americans, Leslie's body was identified by General Thomas Mifflin. The following day his friend Benjamin Rush learned of Leslie's death from British Captain John McPherson while treating the wounded at Princeton. On 5 January at Pluckemin, General George Washington ordered military honors for the burial when he learned Leslie was a friend of Rush. The gravestone is in the graveyard of the former St. Paul's Lutheran Church (built 1757), where the Pluckemin Presbyterian Church is now located.

== Legacy ==
In The Death of General Mercer at the Battle of Princeton, January 3, 1777, the painter John Trumbull displays several events of the battle. At the centre, General Hugh Mercer, with his dead horse beneath him, is mortally wounded. At the left, Captain Daniel Neil is bayoneted against a cannon. At the right, Leslie is shown mortally wounded. In the background, Washington and Rush enter the scene.

After the war, Dr. Benjamin Rush placed a gravestone in Leslie's memory at the Pluckemin graveyard. As the original had crumbled, a replacement with the same inscription was erected c. 1836 by Professor Ogilby of Rutgers University at the request of David Leslie-Melville, 8th Earl of Leven. His gravestone is honoured by both British and Scottish flags.

In Memory of the
Hon.^{ble} Capt.^{n} WILL.^{M} LESLIE,
of the 17th British Regiment,
Son of the Earl of Leven,
in Scotland.
He fell Jan.^{y} 3.^{d}, 1777 Aged
26 years, at the battle of
Princeton
His friend, Benj. Rush, M.D., of
Philadelphia
hath caused this Stone
to be erected as a mark
of his esteem for his worth
and of his respect
for his noble family

== Gallery ==
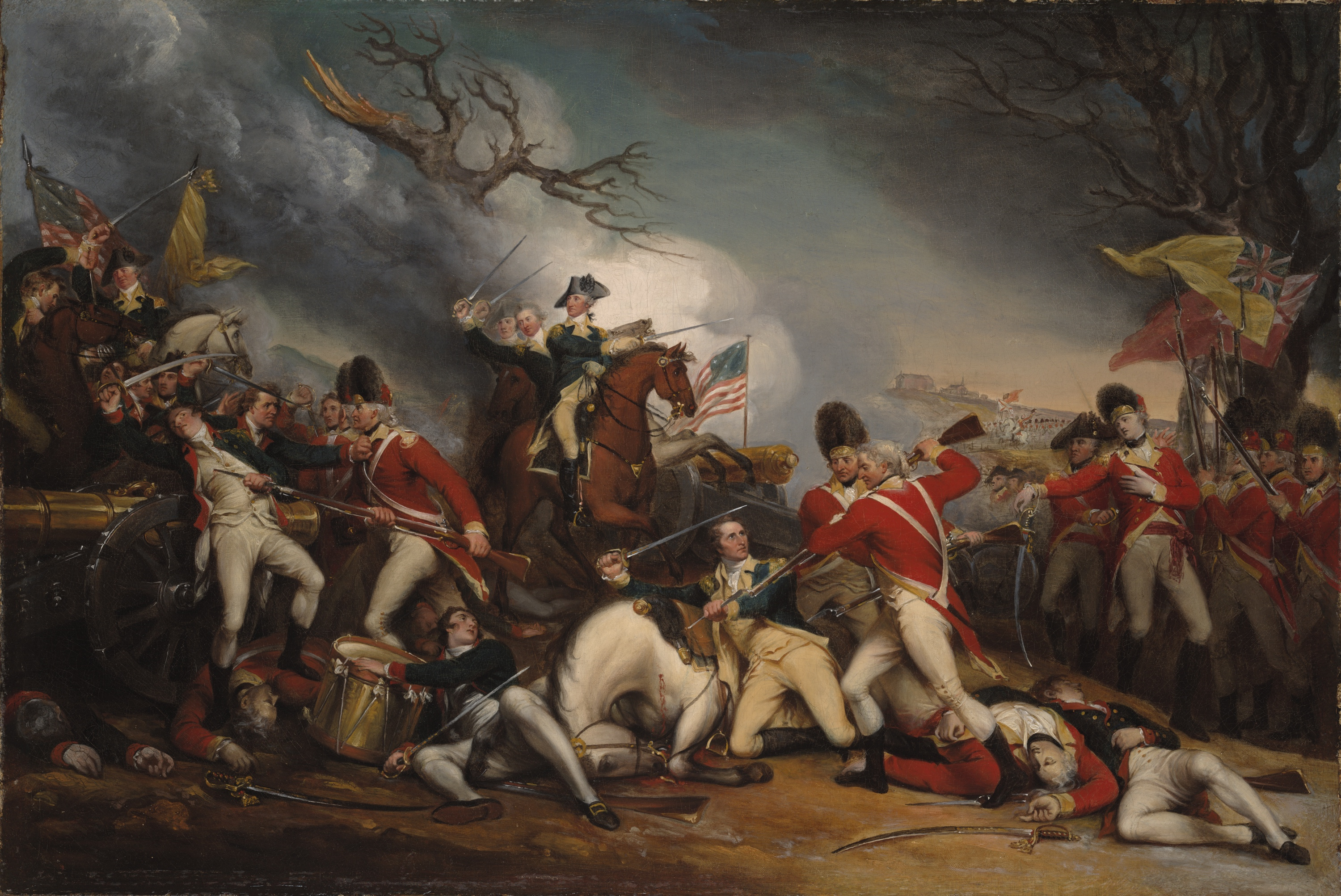
The Death of General Mercer at the Battle of Princeton, January 3, 1777 by John Trumbull, with Leslie, shown on the right, mortally wounded

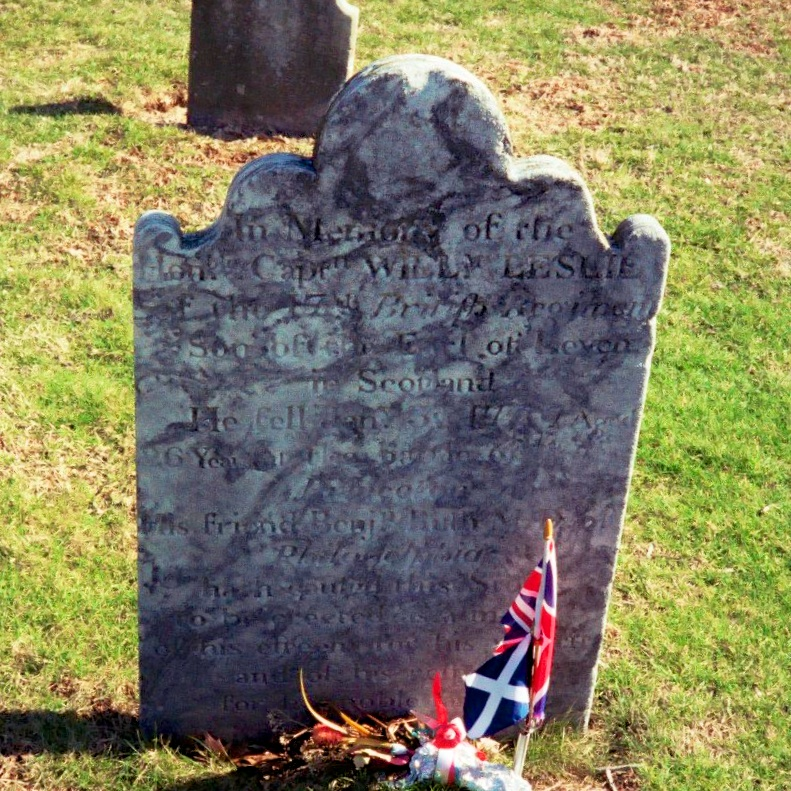
Leslie gravestone at Pluckemin, New Jersey

== Bibliography ==
- Fischer, David Hackett (2006). Washington's Crossing. Oxford University Press. ISBN 0-19-517034-2.
- Fraser, William (1890). "Hon. William Leslie". The Melvilles, Earls of Melville, and the Leslies, Earls of Leven. Vol. First–Memoirs. hdl:2027/mdp.39015035548141.
- Hawke, David Freeman (1971). Benjamin Rush: Revolutionary Gadfly. Ardent Media. p. 180.
- Cohen, Sheldon S (1990). "Captain William Leslie's Paths of Glory". New Jersey History. 108 (Spring/Summer 1990): 54–81.
