= Pluckemin, New Jersey =

Populated place in Somerset County, New Jersey, US

- Census-designated place
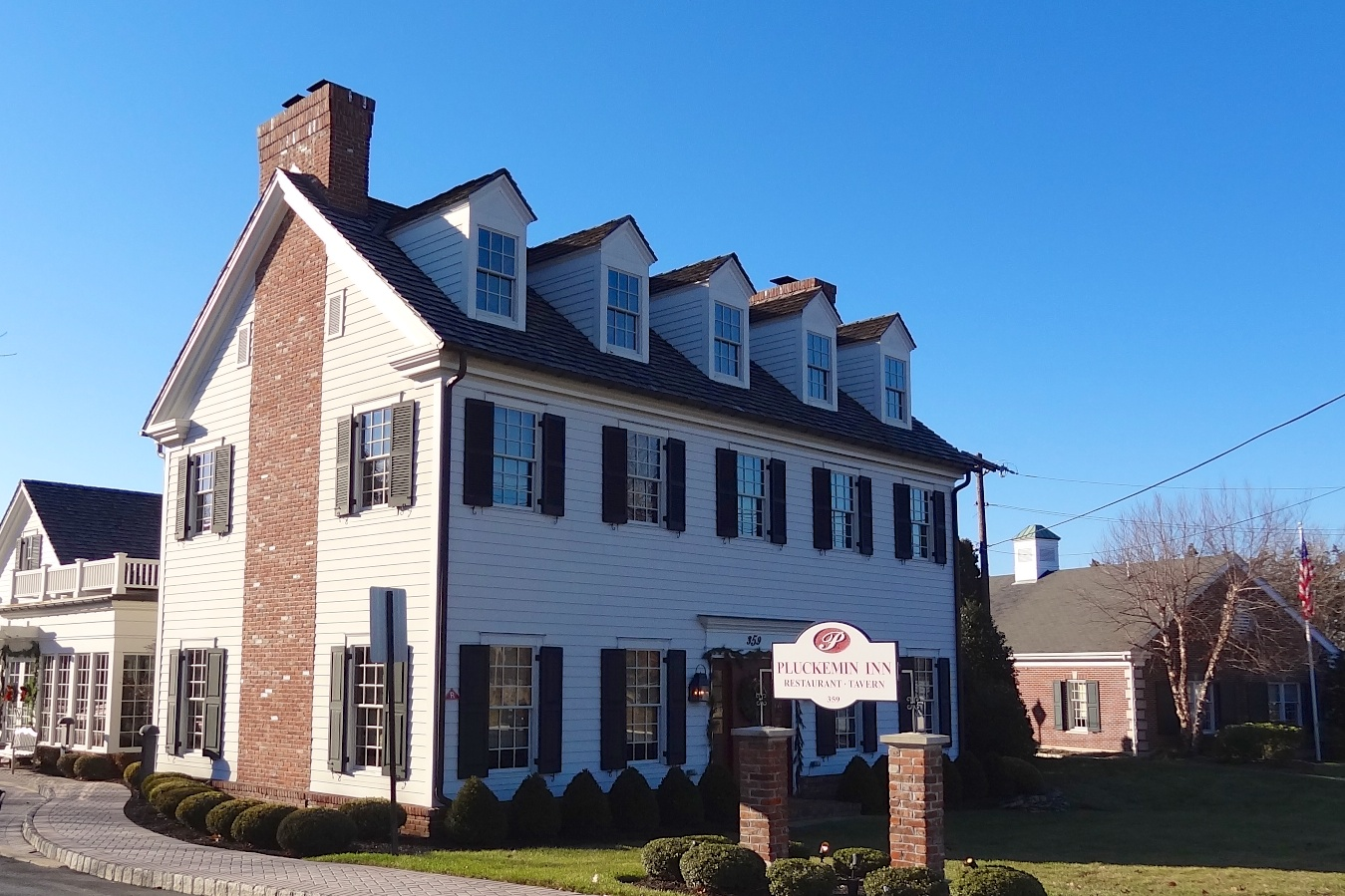
- Pluckemin Inn

- Location in Somerset County Location in New Jersey Location in the United States
- Coordinates: 40°38′44″N 74°38′21″W
- Country: United States
- State: New Jersey
- County: Somerset
- Township: Bedminster

Area
  - Total: 0.69 sq mi (1.80 km^{2})
  - Land: 0.69 sq mi (1.80 km^{2})
  - Water: 0.0039 sq mi (0.01 km^{2})
- Elevation: 184 ft (56 m)

Population (2020)
  - Total: 359
  - Density: 517.8/sq mi (199.93/km^{2})
- FIPS code: 34-59730
- GNIS feature ID: 879376

Pluckemin is an unincorporated community and census-designated place (CDP) located within Bedminster Township, in Somerset County, in the U.S. state of New Jersey. As of the 2020 census, Pluckemin had a population of 359. It was also known historically as Pluckamin. It was the site of several historic events during the American Revolutionary War .

== Demographics ==
Historical population
Census	Pop.	Note	%±
2020	359		—
U.S. Decennial Census; 2020

Pluckemin was first listed as a census designated place in the 2020 U.S. census.

Pluckemin CDP, New Jersey – Racial and ethnic composition Note: the US Census treats Hispanic/Latino as an ethnic category. This table excludes Latinos from the racial categories and assigns them to a separate category. Hispanics/Latinos may be of any race.
Race / Ethnicity (NH = Non-Hispanic)	Pop 2020	2020
White alone (NH)	248	69.08%
Black or African American alone (NH)	12	3.34%
Native American or Alaska Native alone (NH)	0	0.00%
Asian alone (NH)	62	17.27%
Native Hawaiian or Pacific Islander alone (NH)	0	0.00%
Other race alone (NH)	3	0.84%
Mixed race or Multiracial (NH)	11	3.06%
Hispanic or Latino (any race)	23	6.41%
Total	359	100.00%

== History ==
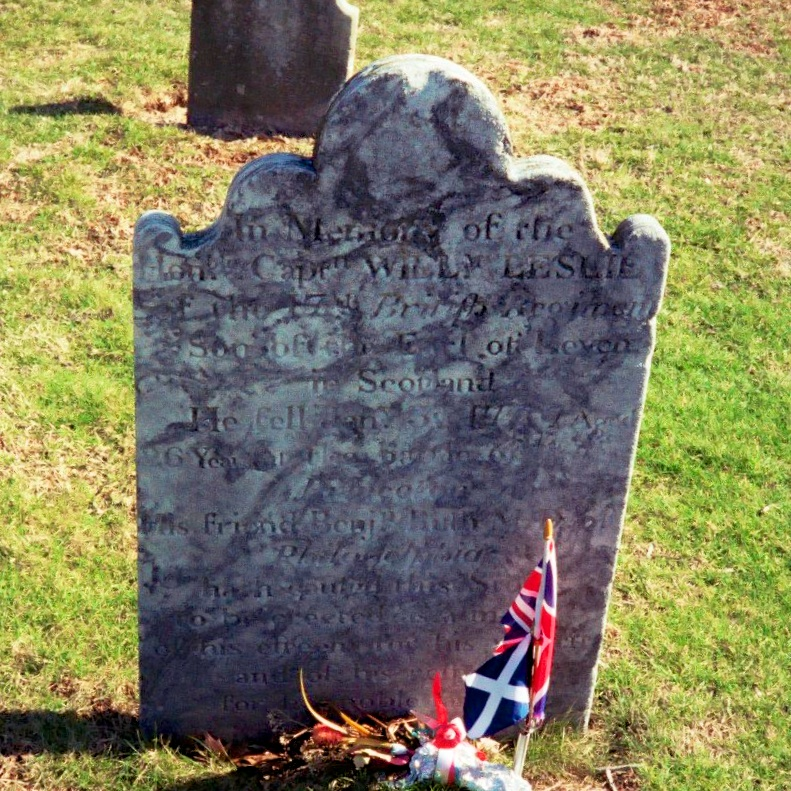
Gravestone of British Captain William Leslie, died during the Battle of Princeton, January 3, 1777

After the victory at Princeton, General George Washington and his army camped nearby from January 4 to 6, 1777 on the march to Morristown. On January 5, General Washington set up his headquarters in a local Pluckemin house, which later became known as the John Fenner House, and wrote his battle report to John Hancock. He also ordered military honors for the battle death of British Captain William Leslie, a friend of the American Dr. Benjamin Rush. The gravestone is in the graveyard of the former St. Paul's Lutheran Church (built 1757), where the Pluckemin Presbyterian Church is now located.

During the winter of 1778–79, the Pluckemin Continental Artillery Cantonment Site, commanded by General Henry Knox, was located nearby.

On February 18, 1779, General Knox organized a grand celebration, The French Alliance Ball, for the first anniversary of the alliance with France. In attendance were General Washington and his wife Martha. Over four hundred people enjoyed dancing, drinking and fireworks.

== Historic district ==
The Pluckemin Village Historic District was added to the National Register of Historic Places on July 26, 1982.

== Transportation ==
Pluckemin is intersected by two major roads: U.S. Route 202 / U.S. Route 206 (north-south) and County Route 620 / Burnt Mills Road / Washington Valley Road (east-west).

== See also ==
- Pluckemin Continental Artillery Cantonment Site
- Pluckemin Village Historic District
