= George Washington in the American Revolution =

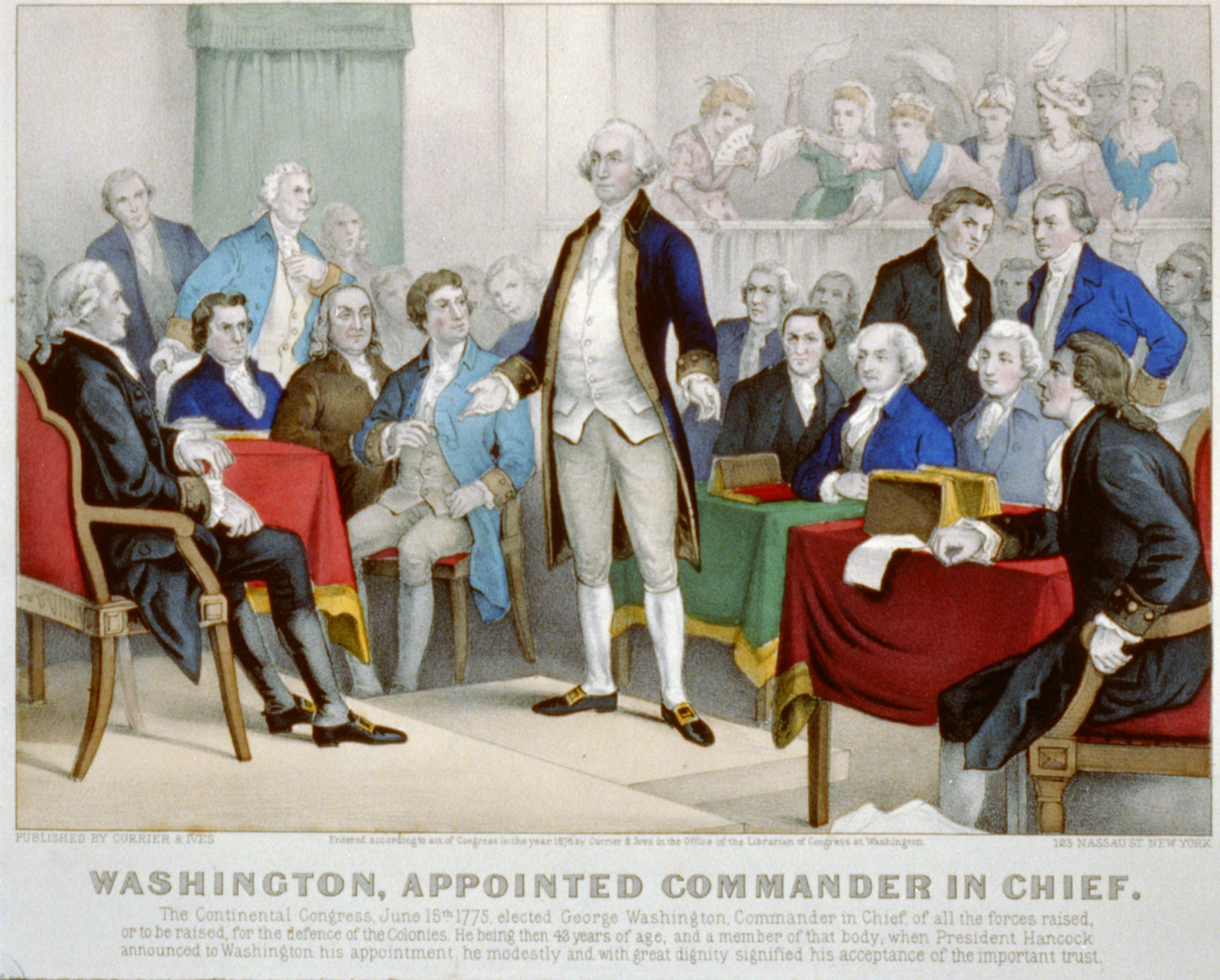
- Currier and Ives depiction of Washington accepting his Continental Army commission from the Second Continental Congress
- Military career
- Branch: Continental Army
- Service years: 1775–1783
- Rank: General and Commander in Chief
- Commands: Main Army
- Conflicts: Boston campaign; Siege of Boston; Fortification of Dorchester Heights; New York and New Jersey campaign; Battle of Long Island; Landing at Kip's Bay; Battle of Harlem Heights; Battle of White Plains; Battle of Trenton; Battle of the Assunpink Creek; Battle of Princeton; Philadelphia campaign; Battle of Brandywine; Battle of the Clouds; Battle of Germantown; Battle of White Marsh; Battle of Monmouth; Yorktown campaign; Siege of Yorktown
- Other work: Delegate to the Continental Congress from Virginia

George Washington (February 22, 1732 – December 14, 1799) commanded the Continental Army in the American Revolutionary War (1775–1783). After serving as President of the United States (1789 to 1797), he briefly was in charge of a new army in 1798. Washington played a major role for the British Empire during the French and Indian War, which was the North American Theater of Operations of the European the Seven Years' War, fought from 1754 to 1763. His success increased the colonial territory of Great Britain on American soil. Disputes over frontier policy and paying for the war led to colonial discontent and to the American Revolution.

On June 15, 1775, delegates to the Second Continental Congress in Philadelphia unanimously appointed Washington as commander-in-chief of the Continental Army, which it created the day before. Washington commanded the American forces in the American Revolutionary War. The first battles of the war were the Battles of Lexington and Concord in April 1775. Congress appointed Washington as the first commander-in-chief of the new Continental Army on June 14, 1775. The task he took on was enormous, balancing regional demands, competition among his subordinates, morale among the rank and file, attempts by Congress to manage the army's affairs too closely, requests by state governors for support, and an endless need for resources with which to feed, clothe, equip, arm, and move the troops. He was not usually in command of the many state militia units.

In the early years of the war, Washington was often in the middle of the action, first directing the year-long siege of Boston to its successful conclusion, but then losing New York City and almost losing New Jersey before winning surprising and decisive victories at Trenton and Princeton at the end of the 1776 campaign season. At the end of the year in both 1775 and 1776, he had to deal with expiring enlistments, since the Congress had only authorized the army's existence for a year at a time. With the 1777 establishment of a more permanent army structure and the introduction of three-year enlistments, Washington built a reliable cohort of experienced troops, although hard currency and supplies of all types were difficult to come by. In 1777 Washington was again defeated in the defense of Philadelphia, but sent critical support to Horatio Gates that made the defeat of Burgoyne at Saratoga possible. Following a difficult winter at Valley Forge and the entry of France into the war in 1778, Washington followed the British army as it withdrew from Philadelphia back to New York, and fought an ultimately inconclusive battle at Monmouth Court House in New Jersey.

Washington's activities from late 1778 to 1780 were more diplomatic and organizational, as his army remained outside New York, watching Major General Sir Henry Clinton's army that occupied the city. Washington strategized with the French on how best to cooperate in actions against the British, leading to ultimately unsuccessful attempts to dislodge the British from Newport, Rhode Island, and Savannah, Georgia. His attention was also drawn to the frontier war, which prompted the 1779 Continental Army expedition of John Sullivan into upstate New York. When Major General Clinton sent the turncoat Brigadier General Benedict Arnold to raid in Virginia, Washington began to detach elements of his army to face the growing threat there. The arrival of Lord Cornwallis in Virginia after campaigning in the south presented Washington with an opportunity to strike a decisive blow. Washington's army and the French army moved south to face Cornwallis, and a cooperative French navy under Admiral de Grasse successfully disrupted British attempts to control of the Chesapeake Bay, completing the entrapment of Cornwallis, who surrendered after the siege of Yorktown in October 1781. Although Yorktown marked the end of significant hostilities in North America, the British still occupied New York and other cities, so Washington had to maintain the army in the face of a bankrupt Congress and troops that were at times mutinous over conditions and pay. The army was formally disbanded after peace in 1783, and Washington resigned his commission as commander-in-chief on December 23, 1783.

== Military experience ==
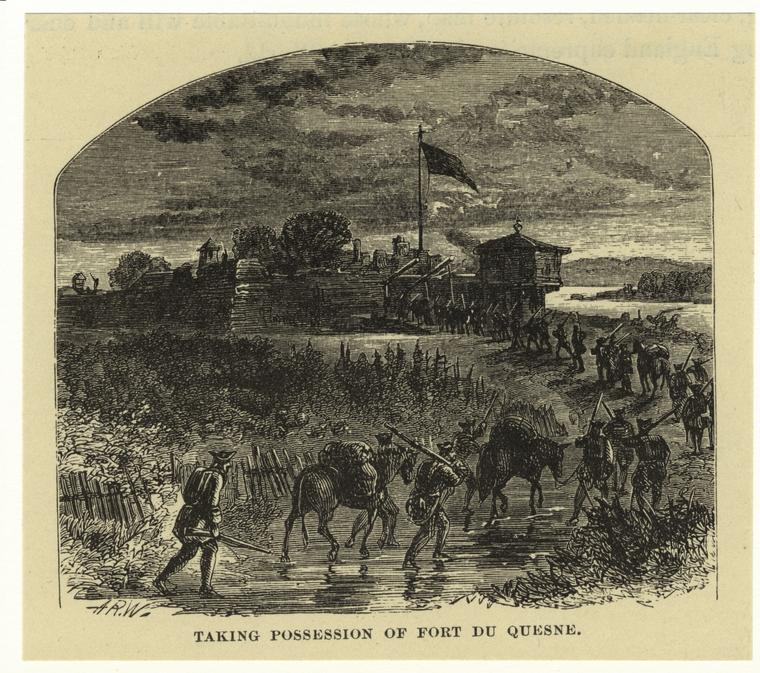
Washington was in the vanguard of British forces that occupied Fort Duquesne in Pittsburgh after it was abandoned by the French in 1758

George Washington was born into a well-to-do family near Fredericksburg, Virginia, in what was then British America on 1732 [O.S. 1731], Washington was schooled locally until the age of 15. The early death of his father when he was 11 eliminated the possibility of schooling in England, and his mother rejected attempts to place him in the Royal Navy. Thanks to the connection by marriage of his half-brother Lawrence to the wealthy Fairfax family, Washington was appointed surveyor of Culpeper County in 1749; he was just 17 years old. Washington's brother had purchased an interest in the Ohio Company, a land acquisition and settlement company whose objective was the settlement of Virginia's frontier areas, including the Ohio Country, territory north and west of the Ohio River. Its investors also included Virginia's Royal Governor, Robert Dinwiddie, who appointed Washington a major in the provincial militia in February 1753.

Washington played a key role in the outbreak of the French and Indian War, and then led the defense of Virginia between 1755 and 1758 as colonel of the Virginia Regiment. Although Washington never received a commission in the British Army, he gained valuable military, political, and leadership skills, and received significant public exposure in the colonies and abroad. He closely observed British military tactics, gaining a keen insight into their strengths and weaknesses that proved invaluable during the Revolution. He demonstrated his toughness and courage in the most difficult situations, including disasters and retreats. He developed a command presence—given his size, strength, stamina, and bravery in battle, he appeared to soldiers to be a natural leader and they followed him without question. Washington learned to organize, train, and drill, and discipline his companies and regiments. From his observations, readings and conversations with professional officers, he learned the basics of battlefield tactics, as well as a good understanding of problems of organization and logistics.

He gained an understanding of overall strategy, especially in locating strategic geographical points. He developed a very negative idea of the value of militia, who seemed too unreliable, too undisciplined, and too short-term compared to regulars. On the other hand, his experience was limited to command of at most 1,000 men, and came only in remote frontier conditions that were far removed from the urban situations he faced during the Revolution at Boston, New York, Trenton and Philadelphia.

== Political resistance ==
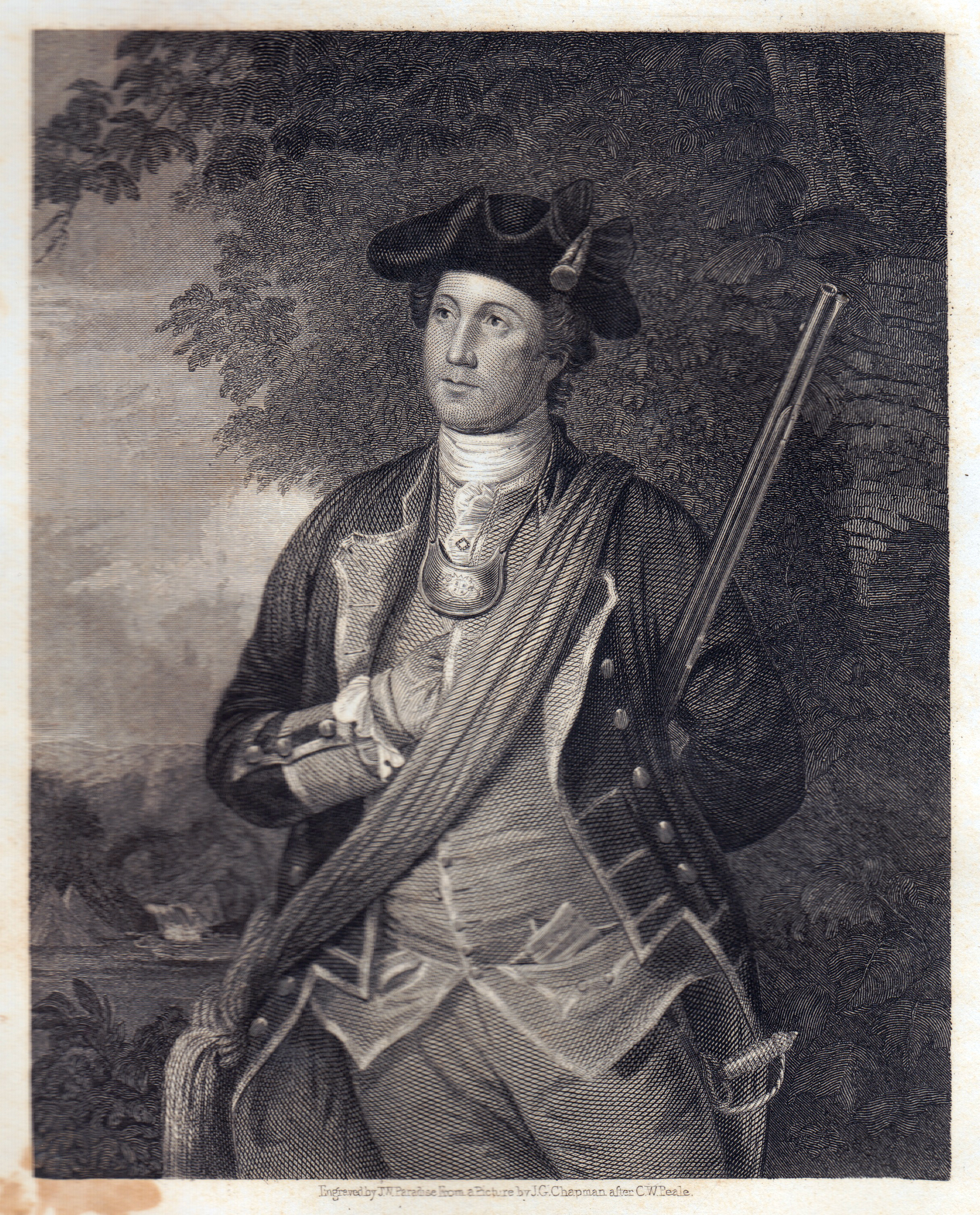
Washington in 1772

In December 1758, Washington resigned his military commission, and spent the next 16 years as a wealthy Virginia plantation proprietor, owning land and slaves; as an estate owner he also served in the Virginia House of Burgesses, the elected assembly. He expressed opposition to the 1765 Stamp Act, the first direct tax on the colonies, but he did not take a leading role in the growing colonial resistance until protests of the Townshend Acts (enacted in 1767) became widespread. In May 1769, Washington introduced a proposal, drafted by his friend George Mason, calling for Virginia to boycott British goods until the Acts were repealed. Parliament repealed the Townshend Acts in 1770, and, for Washington at least, the crisis had passed. However, Washington regarded the passage of the Intolerable Acts in 1774 as "an Invasion of our Rights and Privileges". In July 1774, he chaired the meeting at which the "Fairfax Resolves" were adopted, which called for, among other things, the convening of a Continental Congress. In August, Washington attended the First Virginia Convention, where he was selected as a delegate to the First Continental Congress. As tensions rose in 1774, he assisted in the training of county militias in Virginia and organized enforcement of the boycott of British goods instituted by the Congress.

== Major roles ==
Flag used as George Washington's personal standard, located in the American Revolution Museum

General Washington, the Commander in Chief, assumed five main roles during the war.

- First, he designed the overall strategy of the war, in cooperation with Congress. The goal was always independence. When France entered the war, he worked closely with the soldiers it sent—they were decisive in the great victory at Yorktown in 1781.
- Second, he provided leadership of troops against the main British forces in 1775–1777 and again in 1781. He lost many of his battles, but he never surrendered his army during the war, and he continued to fight the British relentlessly until the war's end. Washington worked hard to develop a successful espionage system to detect British locations and plans. In 1778, he formed the Culper Ring to spy on enemy movements in New York City. In 1780 it discovered Benedict Arnold was a traitor. The British intelligence system was completely fooled in 1781, unaware that Washington and the French armies were moving from the Northeast to Yorktown, Virginia.
- Third, he was charged selecting and guiding the generals. In June 1776, Congress made its first attempt at running the war effort with the committee known as "Board of War and Ordnance", succeeded by the Board of War in July 1777, a committee which eventually included members of the military. The command structure of the armed forces was a hodgepodge of Congressional appointees (and Congress sometimes made those appointments without Washington's input) with state-appointments filling the lower ranks. The results of his general staff were mixed, as some of his favorites never mastered the art of command, such as John Sullivan. Eventually, he found capable officers such as Nathanael Greene, Daniel Morgan, Henry Knox (chief of artillery), and Alexander Hamilton (chief of staff). The American officers never equaled their opponents in tactics and maneuver, and they lost most of the pitched battles. The great successes at Boston (1776), Saratoga (1777), and Yorktown (1781) came from trapping the British far from base with much larger numbers of troops.
- Fourth, he took charge of training the army and providing supplies, from food to gunpowder to tents. He recruited regulars and assigned Baron Friedrich Wilhelm von Steuben, a veteran of the Prussian general staff, to train them, who transformed Washington's army into a disciplined and effective force. The war effort and getting supplies to the troops were under the purview of Congress, but Washington pressured the Congress to provide the essentials. There was never nearly enough.
- Washington's fifth and most important role in the war effort was the embodiment of armed resistance to the Crown, serving as the representative man of the Revolution. His long-term strategy was to maintain an army in the field at all times, and eventually this strategy worked. His enormous personal and political stature and his political skills kept Congress, the army, the French, the militias, and the states all pointed toward a common goal. Furthermore, he permanently established the principle of civilian supremacy in military affairs by voluntarily resigning his commission and disbanding his army when the war was won, rather than declaring himself monarch. He also helped to overcome the distrust of a standing army by his constant reiteration that well-disciplined professional soldiers counted for twice as much as poorly trained and led militias.

=== Intelligence ===
George Washington was a skilled manager of intelligence. He utilized agents behind enemy lines, recruited both Tory and Patriot sources, interrogated travelers for intelligence information, and launched scores of agents on both intelligence and counterintelligence missions. He was adept at deception operations and tradecraft and was a skilled propagandist. He also practiced sound operational security. His main failure was missing all the signals in 1780 that Benedict Arnold was increasingly disaffected and had Loyalist connections.

As an intelligence manager, Washington insisted that the terms of an agent's employment and his instructions be precise and in writing. He emphasized his desire for receiving written, rather than verbal, reports. He demanded repeatedly that intelligence reports be expedited, reminding his officers of those bits of intelligence he had received which had become valueless because of delay in getting them to him. He also recognized the need for developing many different sources so that their reports could be cross-checked, and so that the compromise of one source would not cut off the flow of intelligence from an important area.

Washington sought and obtained a "secret service fund" from the Continental Congress. He strongly wanted gold or silver. In accounting for the sums in his journals, he did not identify the recipients: "The names of persons who are employed within the Enemy's lines or who may fall within their power cannot be inserted." He instructed his generals to "leave no stone unturned, nor do not stick to expense" in gathering intelligence, and urged that those employed for intelligence purposes be those "upon whose firmness and fidelity we may safely rely."

== Boston ==
After the Battles of Lexington and Concord near Boston in April 1775, the colonies went to war. Washington appeared at the Second Continental Congress in a military uniform, signaling that he was prepared for war. Congress created the Continental Army on June 14, 1775, and discussed who should lead it. Washington had the prestige, military experience, charisma and military bearing of a military leader and was known as a strong patriot; he was also popular in his home province. There was no other serious competition for the post, although Washington did nothing to actively pursue the appointment. Massachusetts delegate John Adams nominated Washington, believing that appointing a southerner to lead what was then primarily an army of northerners would help unite the colonies. Washington reluctantly accepted, declaring "with the utmost sincerity, I do not think myself equal to the Command I [am] honored with."

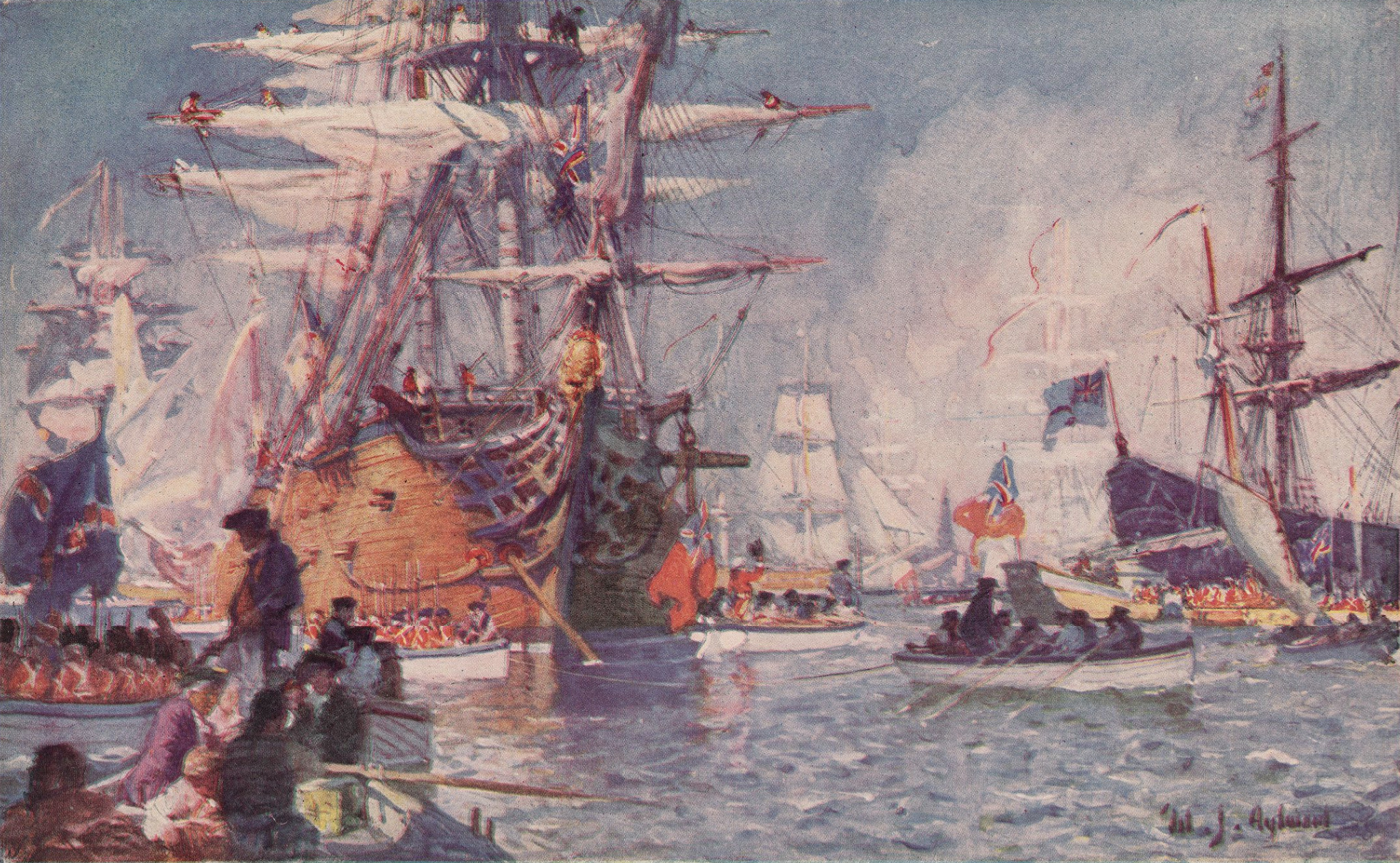
British forces evacuate the city at the end of the Siege of Boston

Washington assumed command of the colonial forces outside Boston on July 3, 1775, during the ongoing siege of Boston, after stopping in New York City to begin organizing military companies for its defense. His first steps were to establish procedures and to weld what had begun as militia regiments into an effective fighting force. He was assisted in this effort by his adjutant, Brigadier General Horatio Gates, and Major General Charles Lee, both of whom had significant experience serving in the British Army.

When inventory returns exposed a dangerous shortage of gunpowder, Washington asked for new sources. British arsenals were raided (including some in the West Indies) and some manufacturing was attempted; a barely adequate supply (about 2.5 million pounds) was obtained by the end of 1776, mostly from France. In search of heavy weapons, he sent Henry Knox on an expedition to Fort Ticonderoga to retrieve cannons that had been captured there. He resisted repeated calls from Congress to launch attacks against the British in Boston, calling war councils that supported the decisions against such action. Before the Continental Navy was established in November 1775, Washington, without Congressional authorization, began arming a "secret navy" to prey on poorly protected British transports and supply ships. When Congress authorized an invasion of Quebec, believing that province's people would also rise against British military control, Washington reluctantly went along with it, even authorizing Benedict Arnold to lead a force from Cambridge to Quebec City through the wilderness of present-day Maine.

As the siege dragged on, the matter of expiring enlistments became a matter of serious concern. Washington tried to convince Congress that enlistments longer than one year were necessary to build an effective fighting force, but he was rebuffed in this effort. The 1776 establishment of the Continental Army only had enlistment terms of one year, a matter that would again be a problem in late 1776.

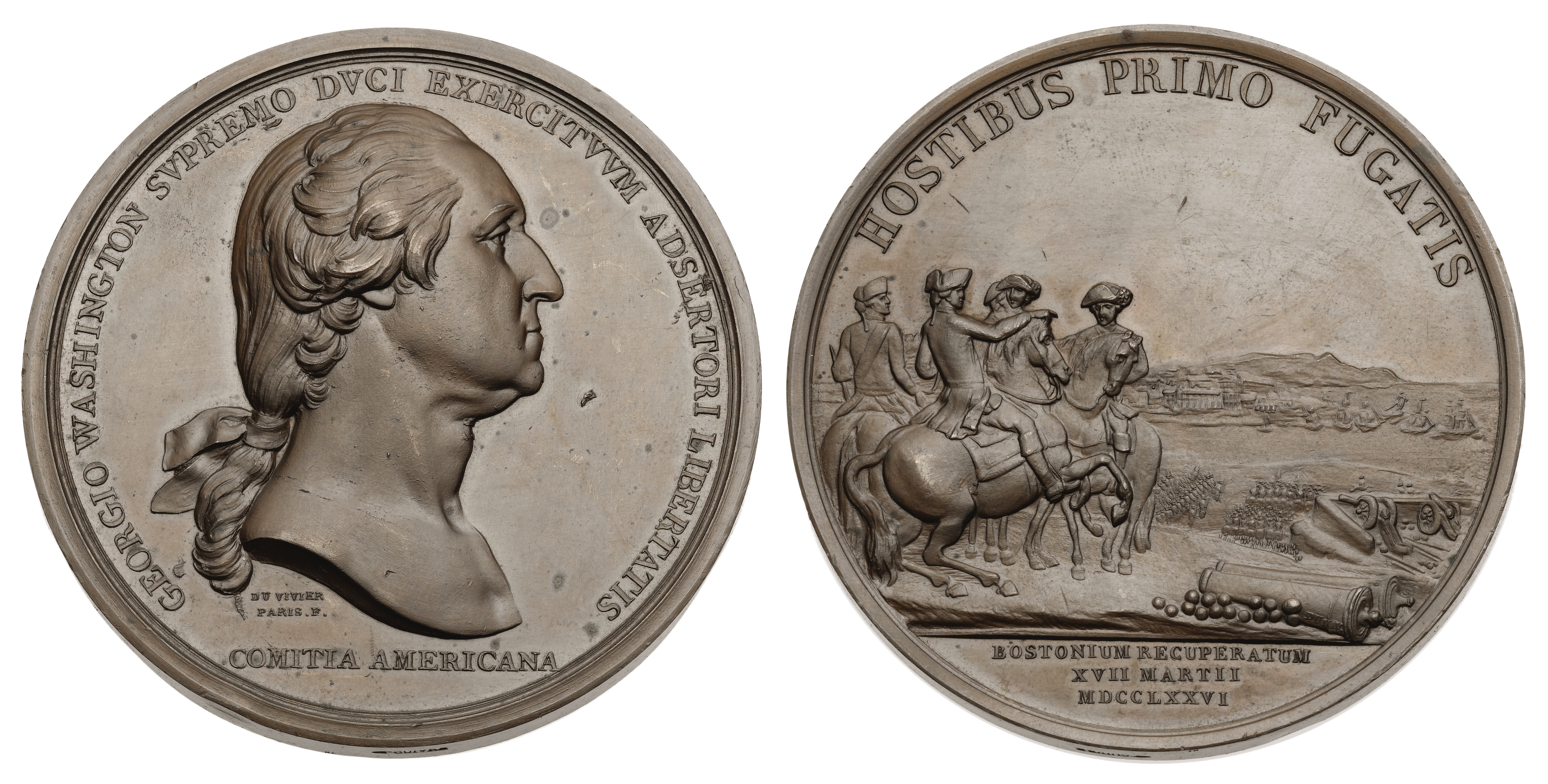
Washington was awarded the first Congressional Gold Medal in 1790 for his first liberating Boston from the British in 1776n.

Washington finally forced the British to withdraw from Boston by putting Henry Knox's artillery on Dorchester Heights overlooking the city, and preparing in detail to attack the city from Cambridge if the British tried to assault the position. The British evacuated Boston and sailed away, although Washington did not know they were headed for Halifax, Nova Scotia. Believing they were headed for New York City (which was indeed Major General William Howe's eventual destination), Washington rushed most of the army there.

== New York and New Jersey Campaign ==
Washington's success in Boston was not repeated in New York. Congress insisted that he defend it and recognizing the city's importance as a naval base and gateway to the Hudson River, Washington delegated the task of fortifying New York to Charles Lee in February 1776. The faltering military campaign in Quebec also led to calls for additional troops there, and Washington detached six regiments northward under John Sullivan in April. The wider theaters of war had also introduced regional frictions into the army. Somewhat surprised that regional differences would be a problem, on August 1 he read a speech to the army, in which he threatened to punish "any officers or soldiers so lost to virtue and a love of their country" that might exacerbate the regional differences. The mixing of forces from different regions also brought more widespread camp diseases, especially dysentery and smallpox.

Washington had to deal with his first major command controversy while in New York, which was partially a product of regional friction. New England troops serving in northern New York under General Philip Schuyler, a scion of an old patroon family of New York, objected to his aristocratic style, and their Congressional representatives lobbied Washington to replace Schuyler with General Gates. Washington tried to resolve the issue by giving Gates command of the forces in Quebec, but the collapse of the Quebec expedition brought renewed complaints. Despite Gates' experience, Washington personally preferred Schuyler. To avoid a potentially messy situation, General Washington gave Schuyler overall command of the northern department, but assigned Gates as second in command with combat authority. The episode exposed Washington to Gates' desire for advancement, possibly at his expense, and to the latter's influence in Congress.

=== Loss of New York City ===
General Howe's army, reinforced by thousands of additional troops from Europe and a fleet under the command of his brother, Admiral Richard Howe, began arriving the entrance of New York Harbor (at the Narrows), in early July, and made an unopposed landing on Staten Island. Without intelligence about Howe's intentions, Washington was forced to divide his still poorly trained forces, principally between Manhattan and Long Island. The Howes, who were politically ambivalent about the conflict, had been authorized to act as peace commissioners, and attempted to establish contact with Washington. However, they refused to address their letters to "General George Washington", and his representatives refused to accept them.

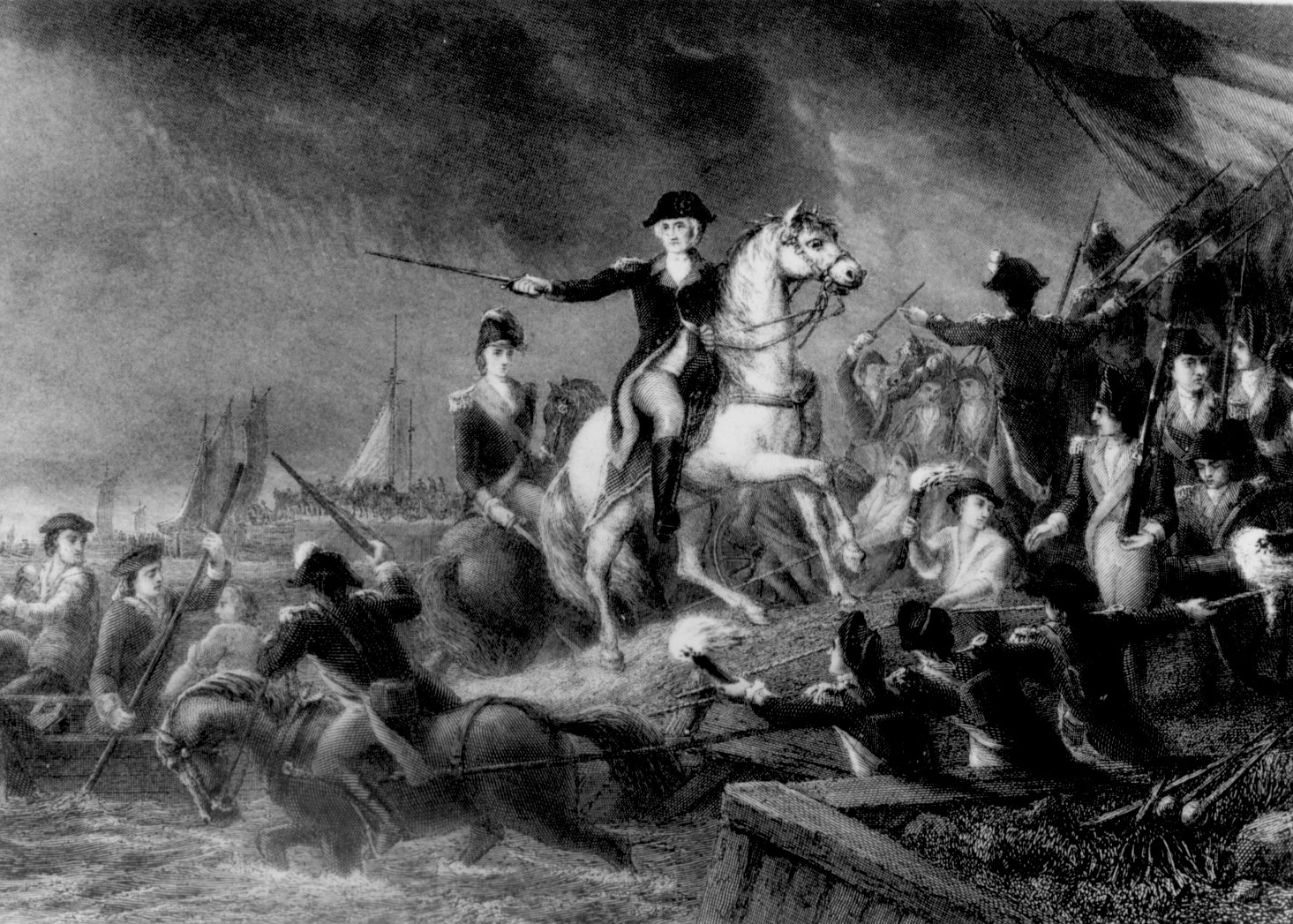
Washington leads the retreat from Long Island

In August, the British finally launched their campaign to capture New York City. They first landed on Long Island in force, and flanked Washington's forward positions in the Battle of Long Island. Major General Howe refused to act on a significant tactical advantage that could have resulted in the capture of the remaining Continental troops on Long Island, but he chose instead to besiege the fortified positions to which they had retreated. Although Washington has been criticized by many historians for sending additional troops to reinforce the redoubts on Long Island, it was clear to both Washington and the Howes that the Americans had successfully blocked the East River against major shipping by sinking ships in the channel, and that he was consequently not risking the entrapment of additional men. In the face of a siege he seemed certain to lose, Washington then decided to withdraw. In what some historians call one of his greatest military feats, he executed a nighttime withdrawal from Long Island across the East River to Manhattan to save those troops and materiel.

The Howe brothers then paused to consolidate their position, and the admiral engaged in a fruitless peace conference with Congressional representatives on September 11. Four days later the British landed on Manhattan, a bombardment from the river scattering inexperienced militia into a panicked retreat, and forcing Washington to retreat further. After Washington stopped the British advance up Manhattan at Harlem Heights on September 16, Howe again made a flanking maneuver, landing troops at Pell's Point in a bid to cut off Washington's avenue of retreat. To defend against this move, Washington withdrew most of his army to White Plains, where after a short battle on October 28 he retreated further north. This isolated the remaining Continental Army troops in upper Manhattan, so Howe returned to Manhattan and captured Fort Washington in mid November, taking almost 3,000 prisoners. Four days later, Fort Lee, across the Hudson River from Fort Washington, was also taken. Washington brought much of his army across the Hudson into New Jersey, but was immediately forced to retreat by the aggressive British advance.

During the campaign a general lack of organization, shortages of supplies, fatigue, sickness, and above all, lack of confidence in the American leadership resulted in a melting away of untrained regulars and frightened militia. Washington grumbled, "The honor of making a brave defense does not seem to be sufficient stimulus, when the success is very doubtful, and the falling into the Enemy's hands probable." Washington was fortunate that General Howe was more focused on gaining control of New York than on destroying Washington's army. Howe's overly rigid adherence to his plans meant that he was unable to capitalize on the opportunities that arose during the campaign for a decisive action against Washington.

=== Counterattack in New Jersey ===
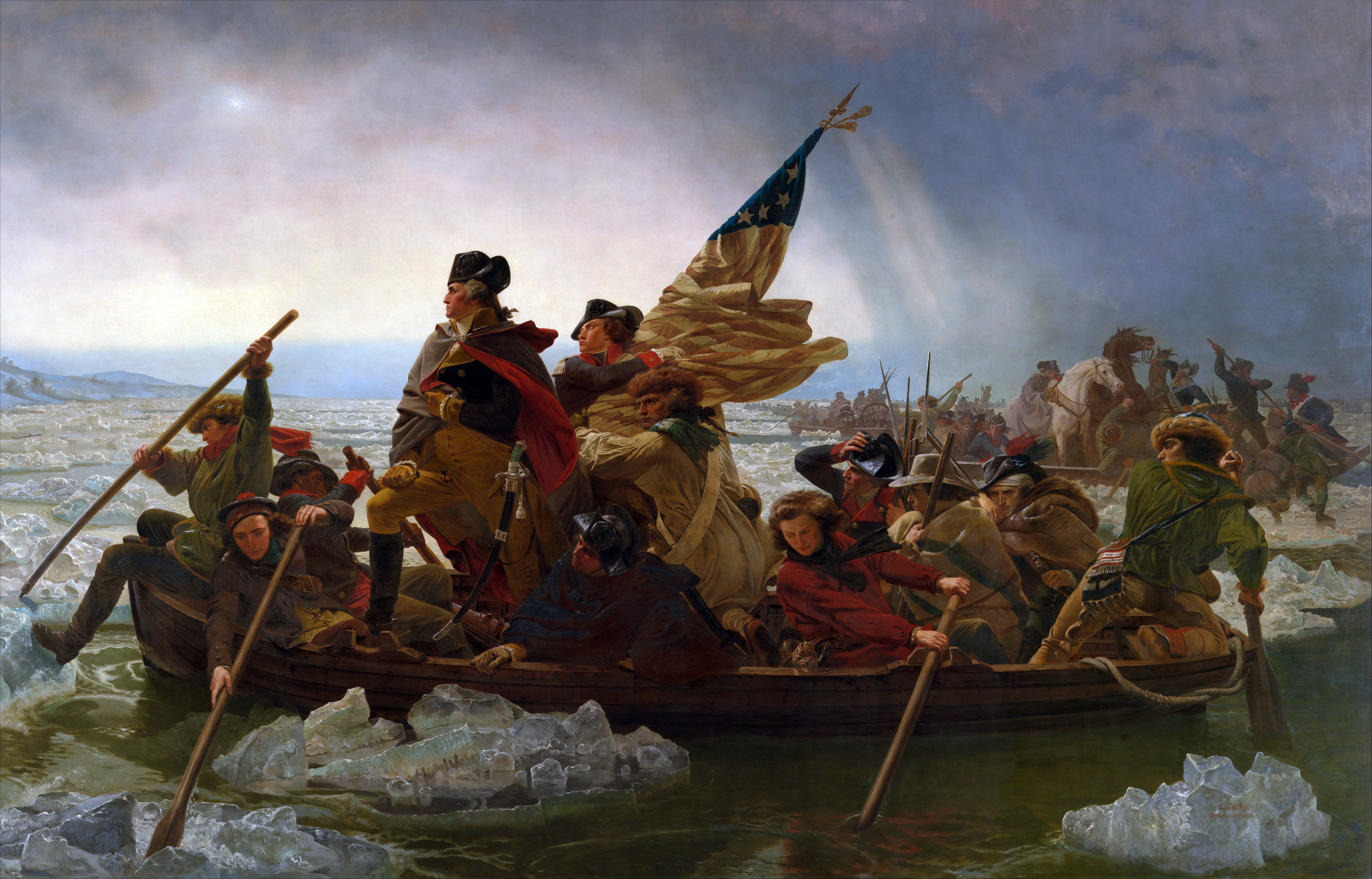
Washington Crossing the Delaware, by Emanuel Leutze, 1851

After the loss of New York, Washington's army was in two pieces. One detachment remained north of New York to protect the Hudson River corridor, while Washington retreated across New Jersey into Pennsylvania, chased by Major General Charles Cornwallis. Spirits were low, popular support was wavering, and Congress had abandoned Philadelphia, fearing a British attack. Washington ordered General Gates to bring troops from Fort Ticonderoga, and also ordered General Lee's troops, which he had left north of New York City, to join him. Lee, whose relationship with Washington was at times difficult, made excuses and only traveled as far as Morristown, New Jersey. When Lee strayed too far from his army on December 12, his exposed position was betrayed by Loyalists, and a British company led by Lieutenant Colonel Banastre Tarleton surrounded the inn where he was staying and took him prisoner. Lee's command was taken over by John Sullivan, who finished marching the army to Washington's camp across the river from Trenton.

The capture of Lee resulted an important point in negotiations between the sides concerning the treatment of prisoners. Since Lee had previously served in the British Army, he was treated as a deserter, and threatened with military punishments appropriate to that charge. Even though he and Lee did not get on well, Washington threatened to treat captured British officers in the same manner Lee and other high-profile prisoners were treated. This resulted in an improvement in Lee's captivity, and he was eventually exchanged for Richard Prescott in 1778.

Despite the loss of troops due to desertion and expiring enlistments, Washington was heartened by a rise in militia enlistments in New Jersey and Pennsylvania. These militia companies were active in circumscribing the furthest outposts of the British, limiting their ability to scout and forage. Although Washington did not coordinate this resistance, he took advantage of it to organize an attack on an outpost of Hessians in Trenton. On the night of December 25–26, 1776, Washington led his forces across the Delaware River and surprised the Hessian garrison the following morning, capturing 1,000 men.

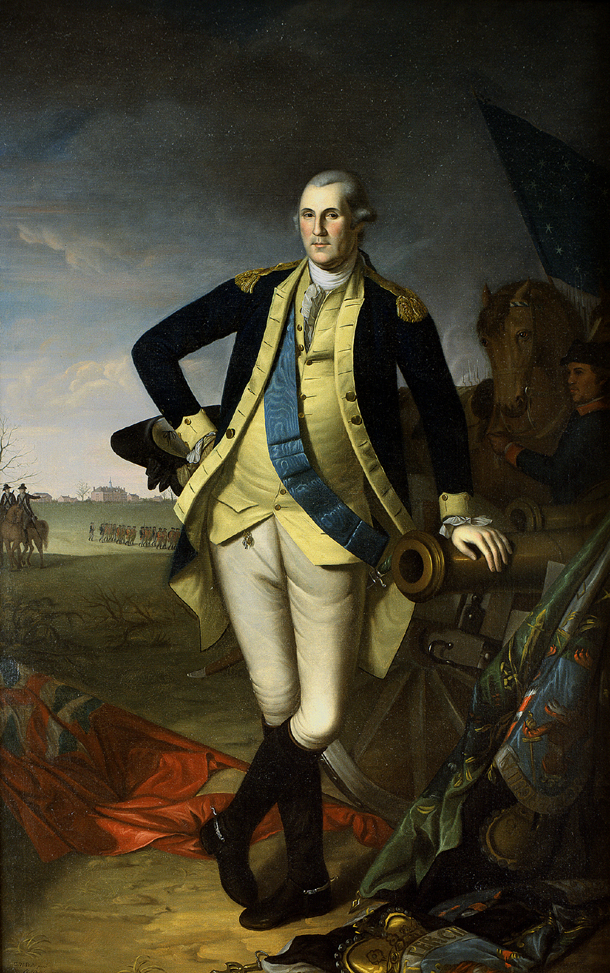
George Washington at Princeton, a 1779 painting by Charles Willson Peale

This action significantly boosted the army's morale, but it also brought Cornwallis out of New York. He reassembled an army of more than 6,000 men, and marched most of them against a position Washington had taken south of Trenton. Leaving a garrison of 1,200 at Princeton, Cornwallis then attacked Washington's position on January 2, 1777, and was three times repulsed before darkness set in. During the night Washington evacuated the position, masking his army's movements by instructing the camp guards to maintain the appearance of a much larger force. Washington then circled around Cornwallis's position with the intention of attacking the Princeton garrison.

On January 3, Hugh Mercer, leading the American advance guard, encountered British soldiers from Princeton under the command of Charles Mawhood. The British troops engaged Mercer and in the ensuing battle, Mercer was mortally wounded. Washington sent reinforcements under General John Cadwalader, which were successful in driving Mawhood and the British from Princeton, with many of them fleeing to Cornwallis in Trenton. The British lost more than one quarter of their force in the battle, and American morale rose with the victory.

These unexpected victories drove the British back to the New York City area, and gave a dramatic boost to Revolutionary morale. During the winter, Washington, based in winter quarters at Morristown, loosely coordinated a low-level militia war against British positions in New Jersey, combining the actions of New Jersey and Pennsylvania militia companies with careful use of Continental Army resources to harry and harass the British and German troops quartered in New Jersey.

Washington's mixed performance in the 1776 campaigns had not led to significant criticism in Congress. Before fleeing Philadelphia for Baltimore in December, Congress granted Washington powers that have ever since been described as "dictatorial". The successes in New Jersey nearly deified Washington in the eyes of some Congressmen, and the body became much more deferential to him as a result. John Adams complained of the "superstitious veneration" that Washington was receiving. Washington's performance also received international notice: Frederick the Great, one of the greatest military minds, wrote that "the achievements of Washington [at Trenton and Princeton] were the most brilliant of any recorded in the history of military achievements." The French foreign minister, a strong supporter of the American cause, renewed the delivery of French supplies.

== Philadelphia and Valley Forge ==
=== Early maneuvers ===
In May 1777, uncertain whether General Howe would move north toward Albany or south toward Philadelphia, Washington moved his army to the Middlebrook encampment in New Jersey's Watchung Mountains. When Howe then moved his army southwest from New Brunswick, Washington correctly interpreted this as a move to draw him out of his strong position, and refused to move. Only after Howe apparently retreated toward the shore did Washington follow, but Howe's attempt to separate him from his mountain defenses was foiled in the Battle of Short Hills in late June. Howe, who had already decided to campaign against Philadelphia, then withdrew from New Jersey, embarked much of his army on ships in late July, and sailed away, leaving Washington mystified as to his destination.

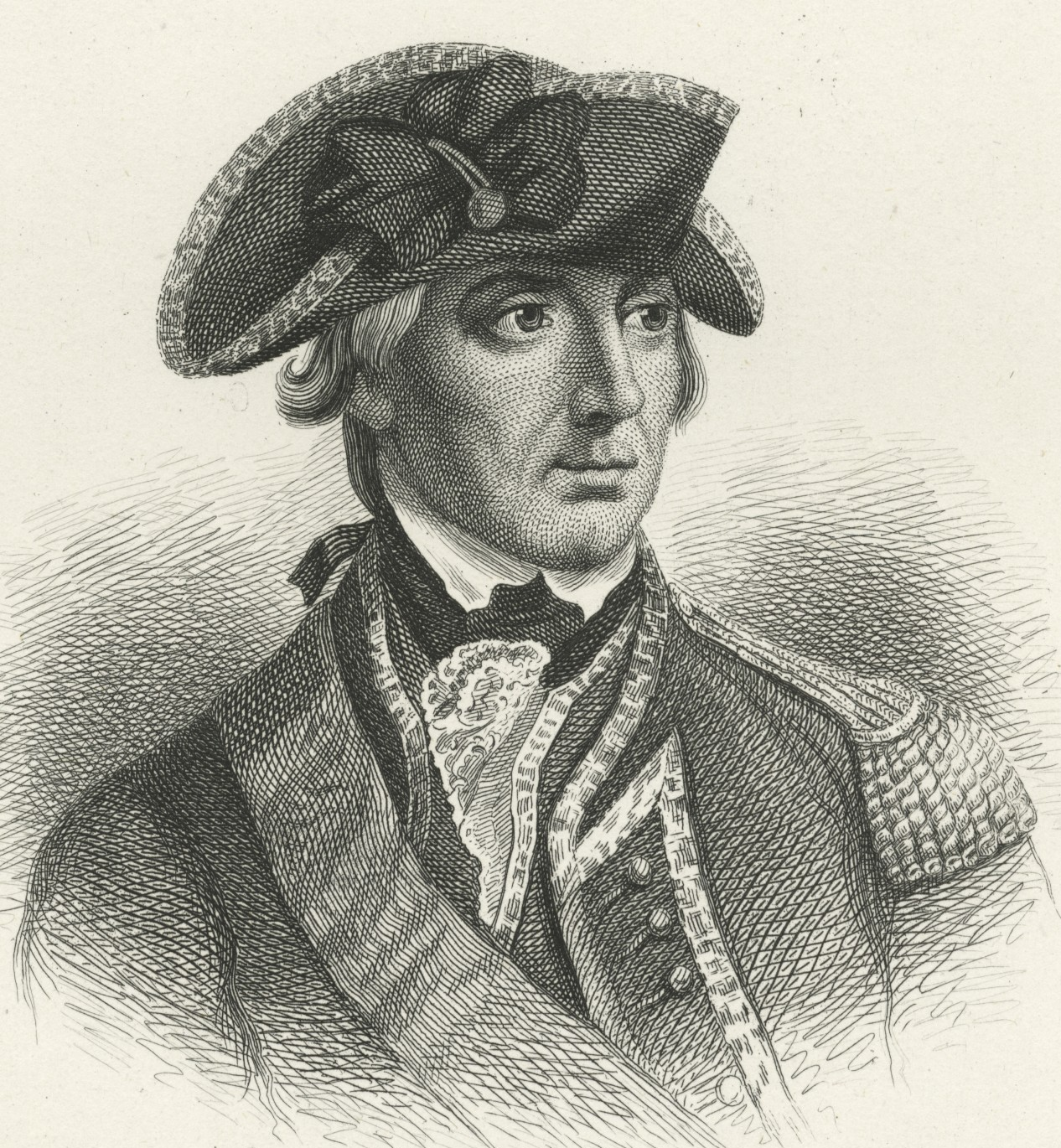
British Army Major General William Howe

Washington's difficulty in discerning Howe's motives was due to the presence of a British army moving south from Quebec toward Fort Ticonderoga under the command of General John Burgoyne. Howe's departure was in part prompted by the successful capture of the fort by Burgoyne in early July. Although there had been an expectation on Burgoyne's part that Howe would support his campaign to gain control of the Hudson, Howe was to disappoint Burgoyne, with disastrous consequences to the British. When Washington learned of the abandonment of Ticonderoga (which he had been told by General Anthony Wayne "can never be carried, without much loss of blood"), he was shocked. Concerned that Howe was heading up the Hudson, he ordered three of his best officers northwards, Benedict Arnold, Benjamin Lincoln, and Daniel Morgan and his corps of riflemen. He also sent 750 men from Israel Putnam's forces north to assist General Gates with the defense of the Hudson.

Washington had had some difficulty with General Arnold in the spring. Congress had adopted a per-state scheme for the promotion of general officers, which resulted in the promotion of several officers to major general ahead of other officers with more experience or seniority. Combined with the commissioning of foreign officers to high ranks, this had led to the resignation of John Stark. Arnold, who had distinguished himself in the Canadian campaign, had also threatened to resign. Washington wrote to Congress on behalf of Arnold and other officers who were disgruntled by this promotion scheme, stating that "two or three other very good officers" might be lost because of it. Washington had also laid the seeds for conflict between Arnold and Gates when he gave Arnold command of forces in Rhode Island in late 1776; because of this move Gates came to view Arnold as a competitor for advancement, and the previously positive relationship between Gates and Arnold cooled. However, Arnold put aside his complaints when the news of Ticonderoga's fall arrived, and agreed to serve.

Congress, at the urging of its diplomatic representatives in Europe, had also issued military commissions to a number of European soldiers of fortune in early 1777. Two of those recommended by Silas Deane, the Marquis de Lafayette and Thomas Conway, would prove to be important in Washington's activities. Lafayette, just twenty years old, was at first told that Deane had exceeded his authority in offering him a major general's commission, but offered to volunteer in the army at his own expense. Washington and Lafayette took an instant liking to one another when they met, and Lafayette became one of Washington's most trusted generals and confidants. Conway, on the other hand, did not think highly of Washington's leadership, and proved to be a source of trouble in the 1777 campaign season and its aftermath.

=== Fall of Philadelphia ===
When Washington learned that Howe's fleet was sailing north in Chesapeake Bay, he hurried his army south of Philadelphia to defend the city against Howe's threat. Major General Howe turned Washington's flank at the Battle of Brandywine on September 11, 1777, and marched unopposed into Philadelphia on September 26 after some further maneuvers. Washington's failure to defend the capital brought on a storm of criticism from Congress, which fled the city for York, and from other army officers. In part to silence his critics, Washington planned an elaborate assault on an exposed British base in Germantown. The October 4 Battle of Germantown failed in part due to the complexity of the assault, and the inexperience of the militia forces employed in it. Over 400 of Washington's men were captured, including Colonel George Mathews and the entire 9th Virginia Regiment. It did not help that Adam Stephen, leading one of the branches of the attack, was drunk, and broke from the agreed-upon plan of attack. He was court martialed and cashiered from the army. Historian Robert Leckie observes that the battle was a near thing, and that a small number of changes might have resulted in a decisive victory for Washington.

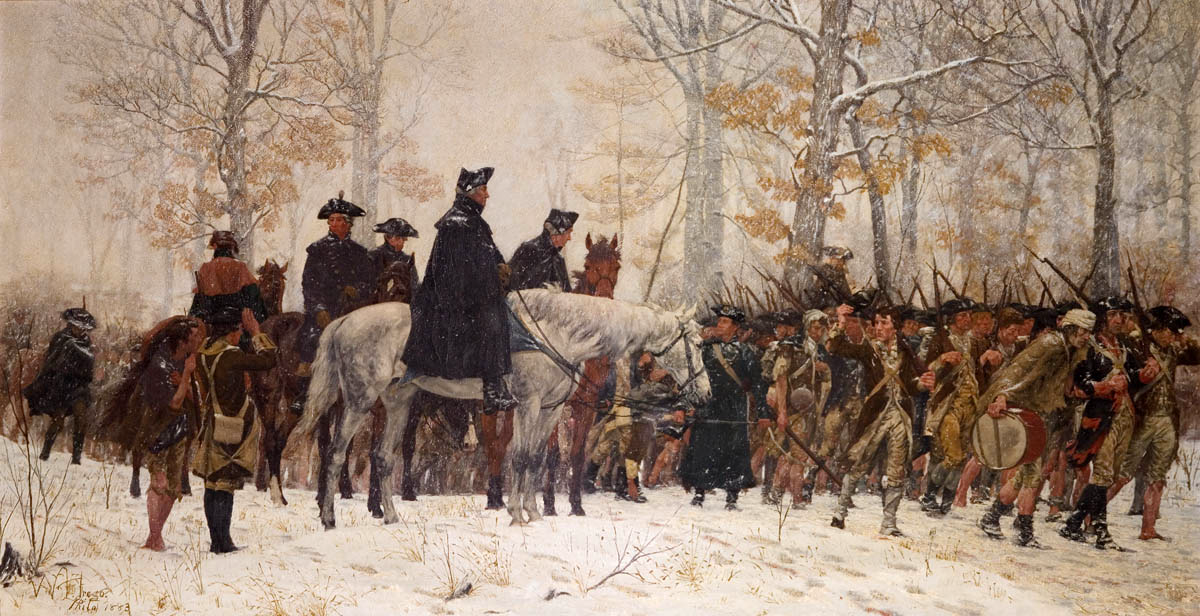
Washington's army marching toward Valley Forge

Meanwhile, Burgoyne, out of reach from help from Howe, was trapped and forced to surrender his entire army on October 17, ten days after the Battle of Bemis Heights. The victory made a hero of General Gates, who received the adulation of Congress. While this was taking place Washington presided from a distance over the loss of control of the Delaware River to the British, and marched his army to its winter quarters at Valley Forge in December. Washington chose Valley Forge, over recommendations that he camp either closer or further from Philadelphia, because it was close enough to monitor British army movements, and protected rich farmlands to the west from the enemy's foraging expeditions.

=== Valley Forge ===
Washington's army stayed at Valley Forge for the next six months. Over the winter, 2,500 men (out of 10,000) died from disease and exposure. The army's difficulties were exacerbated by a number of factors, including a quartermaster's department that had been badly mismanaged by one of Washington's political opponents, Thomas Mifflin, and the preference of farmers and merchants to sell their goods to the British for hard currency instead of the nearly worthless Continental currency. Profiteers also sought to benefit at the army's expense, charging it 1,000 times what they charged civilians for the same goods. Congress responded by authorizing the army to requisition the supplies it needed by force. Washington was reluctant to use such authority, since it smacked of the tyranny the war was supposedly being fought over, but did so once it was apparent there was no other means for the army to survive.

During the winter he introduced a full-scale training program supervised by Baron von Steuben, a veteran of the Prussian general staff. Despite the hardships the army suffered, this program was a remarkable success, and Washington's army emerged in the spring of 1778 a much more disciplined force.

Washington himself had to face discontent at his leadership from a variety of sources. His loss of Philadelphia prompted some members of Congress to discuss removing him from command. They were prodded along by Washington's detractors in the military, who included Generals Gates, Mifflin, and Conway. Gates in particular was viewed by Conway and Congressmen Benjamin Rush and Richard Henry Lee as a desirable replacement for Washington. Although there is no evidence of a formal conspiracy, the episode is known as the Conway Cabal because the scale of the discontent within the army was exposed by a critical letter from Conway to Gates, some of whose contents were relayed to Washington. Washington exposed the criticisms to Congress, and his supporters, within Congress and the army, rallied to support him. Gates eventually apologized for his role in the affair, and Conway resigned. Washington's position and authority were not seriously challenged again. Biographer Ron Chernow points out that Washington's handling of the episode demonstrated that he was "a consummate political infighter" who maintained his temper and dignity while his opponents schemed.

== French entry into the war ==
The victory at Saratoga (and to some extent Washington's near success at Germantown) were influential in convincing France to enter the war openly as an American ally. French entry into the war changed its dynamics, for the British were no longer sure of command of the seas and had to worry about an invasion of their home islands and other colonial territories across the globe. The British, now under the command of Clinton, evacuated Philadelphia in 1778 and returned to New York City, with Washington attacking them along the way at the Battle of Monmouth; this was the last major battle in the north. Prior to the battle Washington gave command of the advance forces to Charles Lee, who had been exchanged earlier in the year. Lee, despite firm instructions from Washington, refused Lafayette's suggestion to launch an organized attack on the British rear, and then retreated when the British turned to face him. When Washington arrived at the head of the main army, he and Lee had an angry exchange of words, and Washington ordered Lee off the command. Washington, with his army's tactics and ability to execute improved by the training programs of the previous winter, was able to recover, and fought the British to a draw. Lee was court martialed and eventually dismissed from the army.

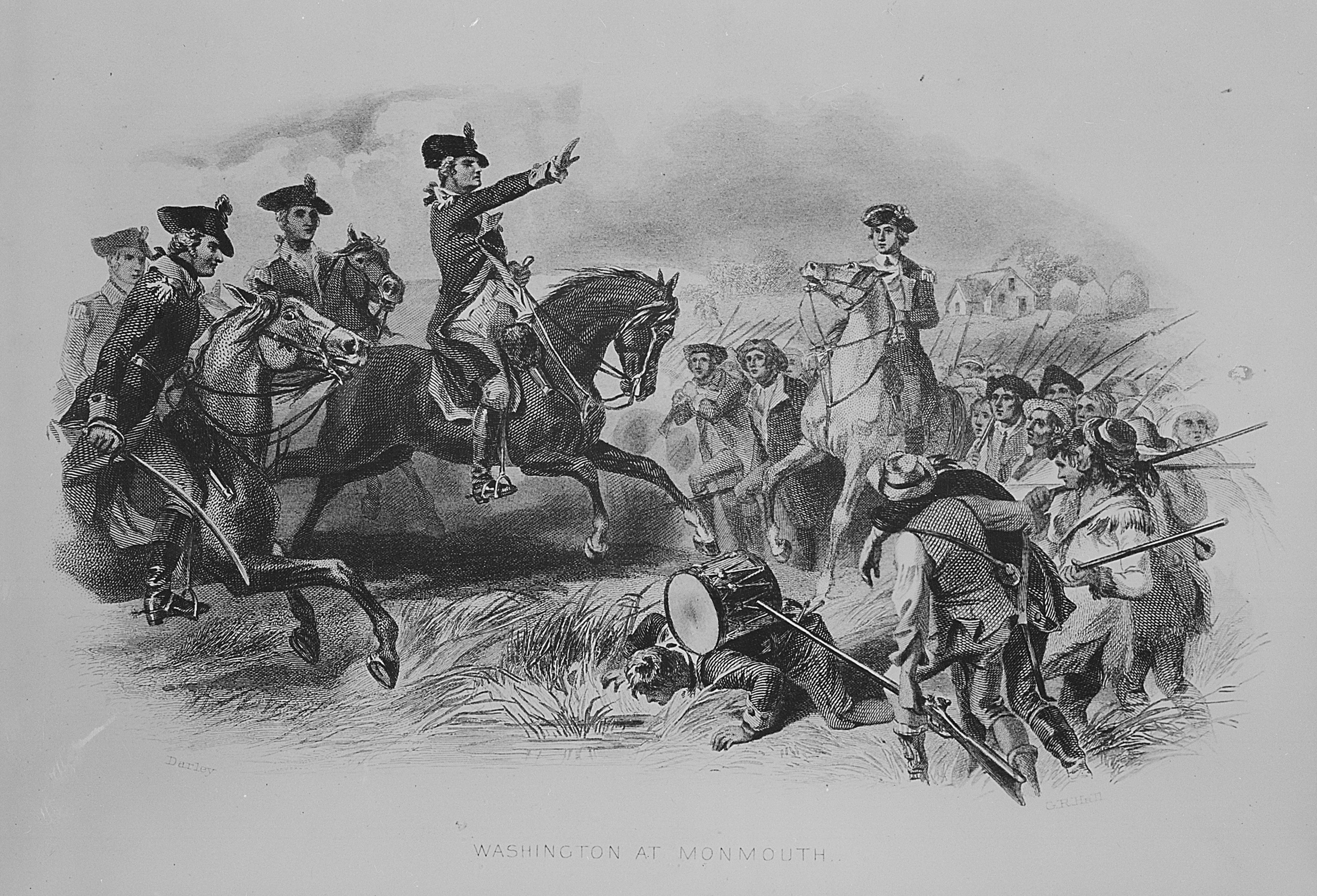
Washington at the Battle of Monmouth

Not long after Clinton's return to New York, a French fleet arrived off the North American coast. Washington was involved in the discussion on how to best use this force, and an attack was planned against the British outpost at Newport, Rhode Island. Despite the presence of two of Washington's most reliable subordinates, Lafayette and Greene, the attempt at cooperation was a dismal failure. British and Indian forces organized and supported by Sir Frederick Haldimand in Quebec began to raid frontier settlements in 1778, and Savannah, Georgia, was captured late in the year.

During the comparatively mild winter of 1778–1779, Washington and Congress discussed options for the 1779 campaign season. The possibility of a Franco-American campaign against Quebec, first proposed for 1778, had a number of adherents in Congress, and was actively supported by Lafayette in Washington's circle. Despite known weaknesses in Quebec's provincial defenses, Washington was adamantly opposed to the idea, citing the lack of troops and supplies with which to conduct such an operation, the nation's fragile financial state, and French imperial ambitions to recover the territory. Under pressure from Congress to answer the frontier raids, Washington countered with the proposal of a major expedition against the Iroquois. This was approved, and in the summer of 1779 a sizable force under Major General John Sullivan made a major expedition into the northwestern frontier of New York in reprisal for the frontier raids. The expedition successfully drove the Iroquois out of New York, but otherwise had little effect on the frequency and severity of frontier raids.

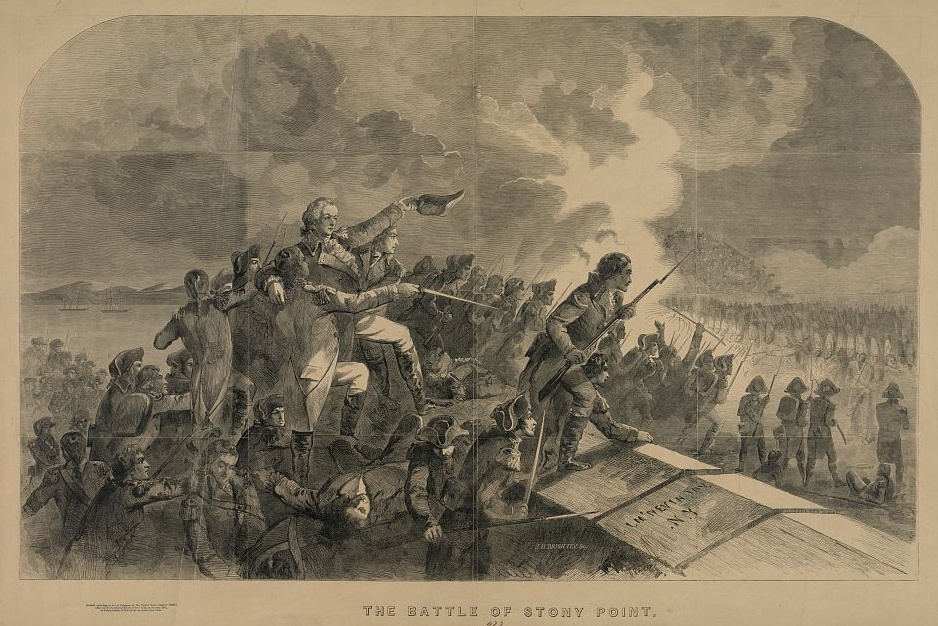
Brigadier General Anthony Wayne leading forces at the 1779 Battle of Stony Point

Washington's opponent in New York, however, was not inactive. Clinton engaged in a number of amphibious raids against coastal communities from Connecticut to Chesapeake Bay, and probed at Washington's defenses in the Hudson River valley. Coming up the river in force, he captured the key outpost of Stony Point, but advanced no further. When Clinton weakened the garrison there to provide men for raiding expeditions, Washington organized a counterstrike. General Anthony Wayne led a force that, solely using the bayonet, recaptured Stony Point. The Americans chose not to hold the post, but the operation was a boost to American morale and a blow to British morale. American morale was dealt a blow later in the year, when the second major attempt at Franco-American cooperation, an attempt to retake Savannah, failed with heavy casualties.

== British southern strategy ==
The winter of 1779–80 was one of the coldest in recorded colonial history. New York Harbor froze over, and the winter camps of the Continental Army were deluged with snow, resulting in hardships exceeding those experienced at Valley Forge. The war was declining in popularity, and the inflationary issuance of paper currency by Congress and the states alike harmed the economy, and the ability to provision the army. The paper currency also hit the army's morale, since it was how the troops were paid. Congress fixed the rate between paper and gold dollars at 40-to-1 in March 1780, but many merchants refused to accept the Continental currency at the official exchange rate. One Loyalist wrote, "Mock-money and mock-states shall melt away // And the mock troops disband for want of pay."

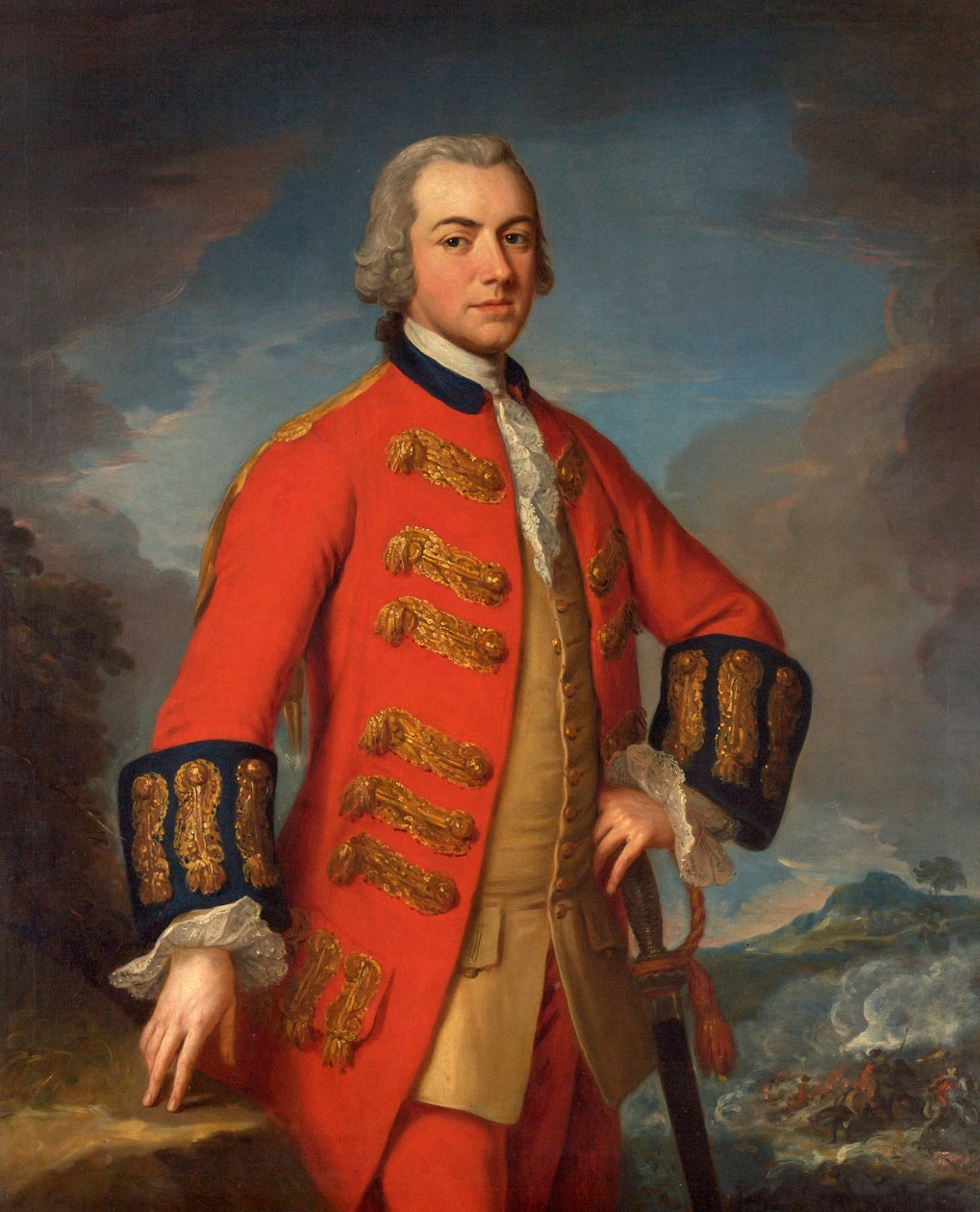
British Major General Henry Clinton

The British in late 1779 embarked on a new strategy based on the assumption that most Southerners were Loyalists at heart. General Clinton withdrew the British garrison from Newport, and marshaled a force of more than 10,000 men that in the first half of 1780 successfully besieged Charleston, South Carolina. In June 1780, he captured over 5,000 Continental soldiers and militia in the single worst defeat of the war for the Americans. Washington had at the end of March pessimistically dispatched several regiments troops southward from his army, hoping they might have some effect in what he saw as a looming disaster. He also ordered troops stationed in Virginia and North Carolina south, but these were either captured at Charleston, or scattered later at Waxhaws and Camden. Camden saw the ignominious defeat of General Gates, who had been appointed to the southern command by Congress without Washington's advice or knowledge beforehand. Gates famously abandoned his army and retreated 180 miles (290 km) by horse after his battle lines were broken. The debacle ended Gates' career as a field officer, but he eluded formal inquiries into his behavior because of his political connections.

Washington's army suffered from numerous problems in 1780: it was undermanned, underfunded, and underequipped. Because of these shortcomings Washington resisted calls for major expeditions, preferring to remain focused on the principal British presence in New York. Knowledge of discontent within the ranks in New Jersey prompted the British in New York to make two attempts to reach the principal army base at Morristown. These attempts were defeated, with significant militia support, in battles at Connecticut Farms and Springfield.

== Arnold's treason ==
The British withdrew from Philadelphia, in June 1778, and Washington appointed Major General Benedict Arnold as military commander of the city. Historian John Shy states:

Washington then made one of the worst decisions of his career, appointing Arnold as military governor of the rich, politically divided city. No one could have been less qualified for the position. Arnold had amply demonstrated his tendency to become embroiled in disputes, as well as his lack of political sense. Above all, he needed tact, patience, and fairness in dealing with a people deeply marked by months of enemy occupation.

September 1780 brought a new shock to Washington. British Major John André had been arrested outside New York, and papers he carried exposed treason by Arnold. Washington greatly respected Arnold for his military skills, and with his serious injuries saw he was not ready for a combat command so he gave him a role in Philadelphia. During his administration there, Arnold entertained lavishly in high society yet had made many political enemies. He married vivacious Peggy Shippen, who had been courted by British Major André. After the wedding she kept in contact with André, who in 1779 became the head of British spy operations in New York City. Arnold in 1779 began secret negotiations with General Clinton. André was his contact, and Peggy passed the messages. Arnold pleaded with Washington, who appointed him commander of West Point, the major Patriot strong point in New York. He agreed to surrender it to the British for £20,000. Arnold was alerted to André's arrest and escaped with only to spare. Everyone on both sides admired André and despised Arnold; Washington offered to exchange André for Arnold, but Clinton could not go that far. André was hanged as a spy, and Arnold became a brigadier general in the British Army. Washington organized an attempt to kidnap Arnold from New York City; it was frustrated when Arnold was sent on a raiding expedition to Virginia.

== Yorktown ==
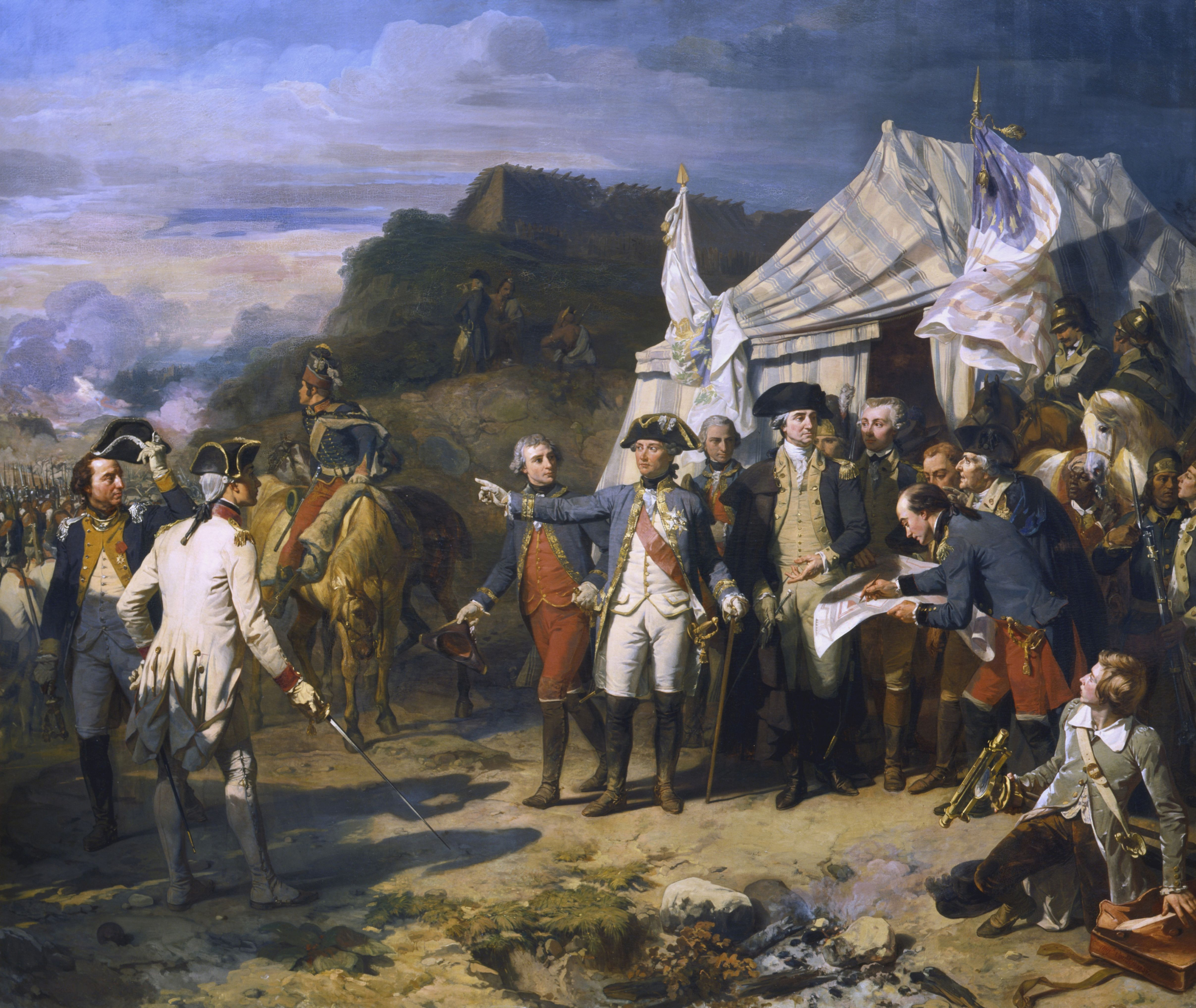
Washington and the Comte de Rochambeau at Yorktown

The early months of 1781 continued to be difficult for the American cause. Troops mutinied in Pennsylvania, inspiring troops in New Jersey to also do so. Washington was uninvolved in resolving the Pennsylvania troops' demands, but he sent troops under General Robert Howe that harshly put down the New Jersey mutiny, hanging two men.

General Arnold's raiding expedition to Virginia was a notable success, ravaging the countryside and destroying military and economic infrastructure and supplies. He was ineffectually opposed by Virginia militia and Continental recruits under Baron von Steuben. Washington ordered Lafayette and additional Continental troops south, and convinced French Admiral Destouches to send his Newport-based fleet to the Chesapeake. Destouches was however opposed by the British fleet of Admiral Marriot Arbuthnot at the Battle of Cape Henry in March 1781, and was unable to gain entry to the bay. General Clinton thereafter sent more troops to Virginia under General William Phillips, who resumed raiding operations in central Virginia.

In the early months of 1781 the French foreign minister, the Comte de Vergennes, realized that the war, now being conducted on a global stage, could not last much longer without decisive action in North America. To this end, the French army at Newport was ordered to join Washington's outside New York, and the Comte de Grasse, commander of that year's West Indies fleet, was ordered to assist in operations in North America. France also gave six million livres to the United States to assist in the war effort.

In May 1781, Washington and the French army command met at Wethersfield, Connecticut, after the French instructions arrived. They discussed options for joint operations, with Washington arguing for an assault on New York, and Rochambeau for operations in Virginia against General Phillips. Rochambeau agreed to bring his army to New York, and dispatches were sent to the West Indies outlining the options to de Grasse.

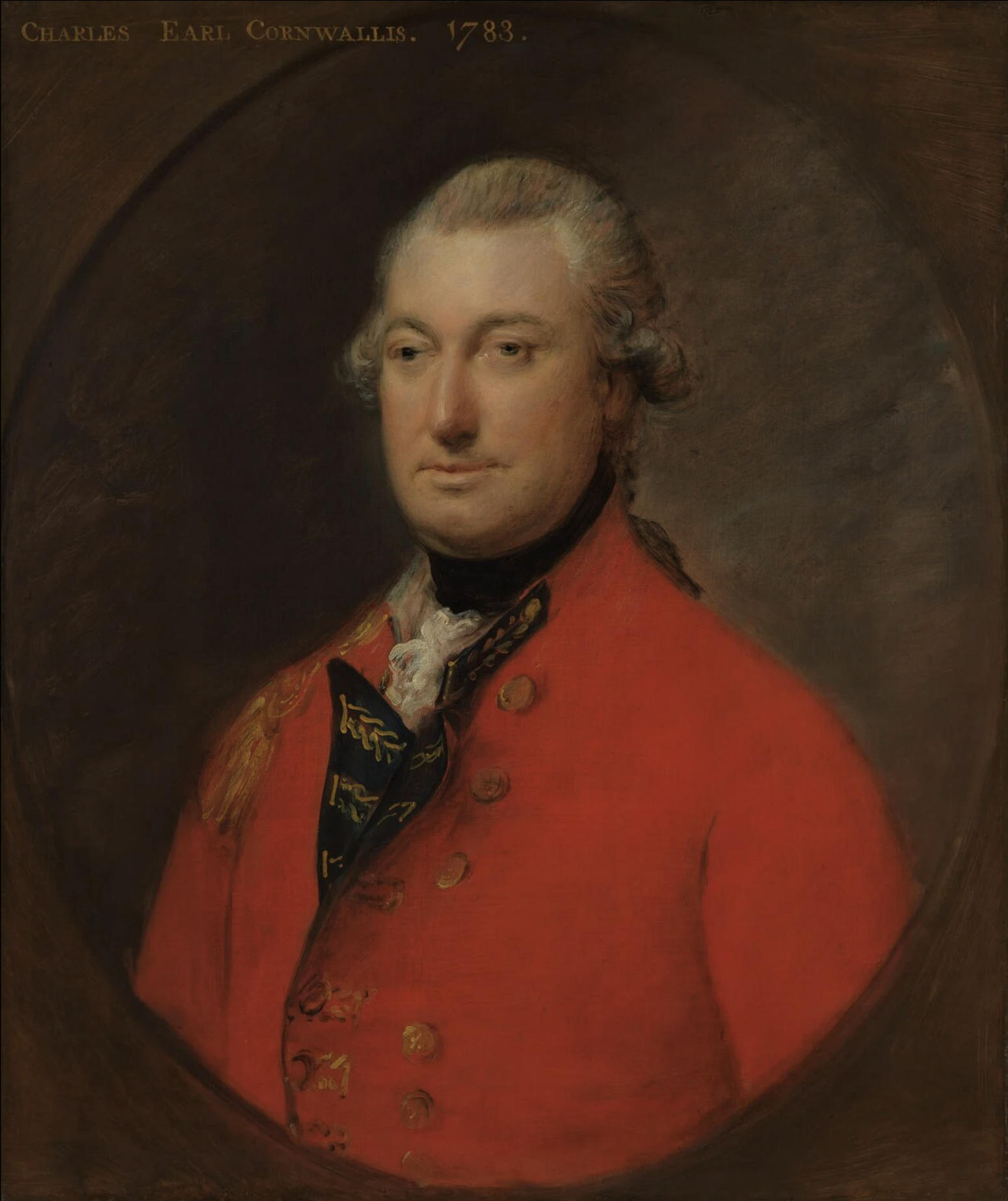
Portrait of Lord Cornwallis, a 1783 painting by Thomas Gainsborough

General Clinton had turned over command of the southern army to General Cornwallis. After the defeat of Gates at Camden, he had nominally gained control over South Carolina, although there was significant militia skirmishing, led by partisan fighters like Francis Marion and Thomas Sumter. Cornwallis then attempted to extend British authority into North Carolina, but one wing of his army was defeated in the October 1780 Battle of Kings Mountain, and another was defeated in the January 1781 Battle of Cowpens. Kings Mountain in particular proved a decisive blow to further attempts to recruit Loyalists, and force Cornwallis had been instructed to rely upon. In the wake of Camden, Washington had selected Nathanael Greene to replace Gates at the head of the southern Continental forces, and Greene waged an effect partisan campaign against Cornwallis. When he finally reached sufficient strength, Greene offered Cornwallis open battle at Hillsboro, North Carolina, in March. Although he lost the Battle of Guilford Court House, Greene inflicted significant casualties on Cornwallis while retaining his own army intact.

Cornwallis moved to Wilmington, North Carolina, to regroup, and then made the controversial decision to bring his army into Virginia, which he saw as the supply base for Greene's army. Joining with the army of Phillips, he maneuvered against the growing Continental presence led by Lafayette, while continuing to raid and destroy economic and military targets in the state. Eventually his decision to enter Virginia reached Clinton, who was surprised at the move. After a series of confusing and sometimes contradictory suggestions, Clinton in late July issued firm orders to Cornwallis to establish a fortified deep-water port in Virginia. Cornwallis informed Clinton that he would do so at Yorktown.

=== Siege and victory ===
Admiral de Grasse received the dispatches of Washington and Rochambeau in mid-July. He immediately sent dispatches north indicating that he would be sailing for the Chesapeake Bay to assist in operations there. When Washington learned of this decision, he reluctantly abandoned the idea of attacking New York. In a brilliant but risky strategic move, he marched 6,000 soldiers from New York to Virginia, leaving the New York highlands only lightly defended. Washington would in later years claim that early preparations to operate against New York were intended to deceive Clinton, but the documentary record of 1781 did not support him. Later operations, as the march got underway, did involve deliberate deception. As part of the march troops appeared to establish camps and other works on the west side of the Hudson, as if preparing for an attack on New York. By the time Clinton saw through the deception, Washington had already crossed the Delaware.

De Grasse sailed north with his entire fleet (28 ships of the line), while his British counterpart, Admiral Rodney (not expecting de Grasse to take his entire fleet) sent only 15 ships in pursuit. In early September, while the French and Continental armies marched south, de Grasse and the British fleet (enlarged by the inclusion of ships from New York to 19 ships) met in the Battle of the Chesapeake. The French victory was strategically vital, for it denied the British control of the Chesapeake and set the stage for the encirclement of Cornwallis at Yorktown.

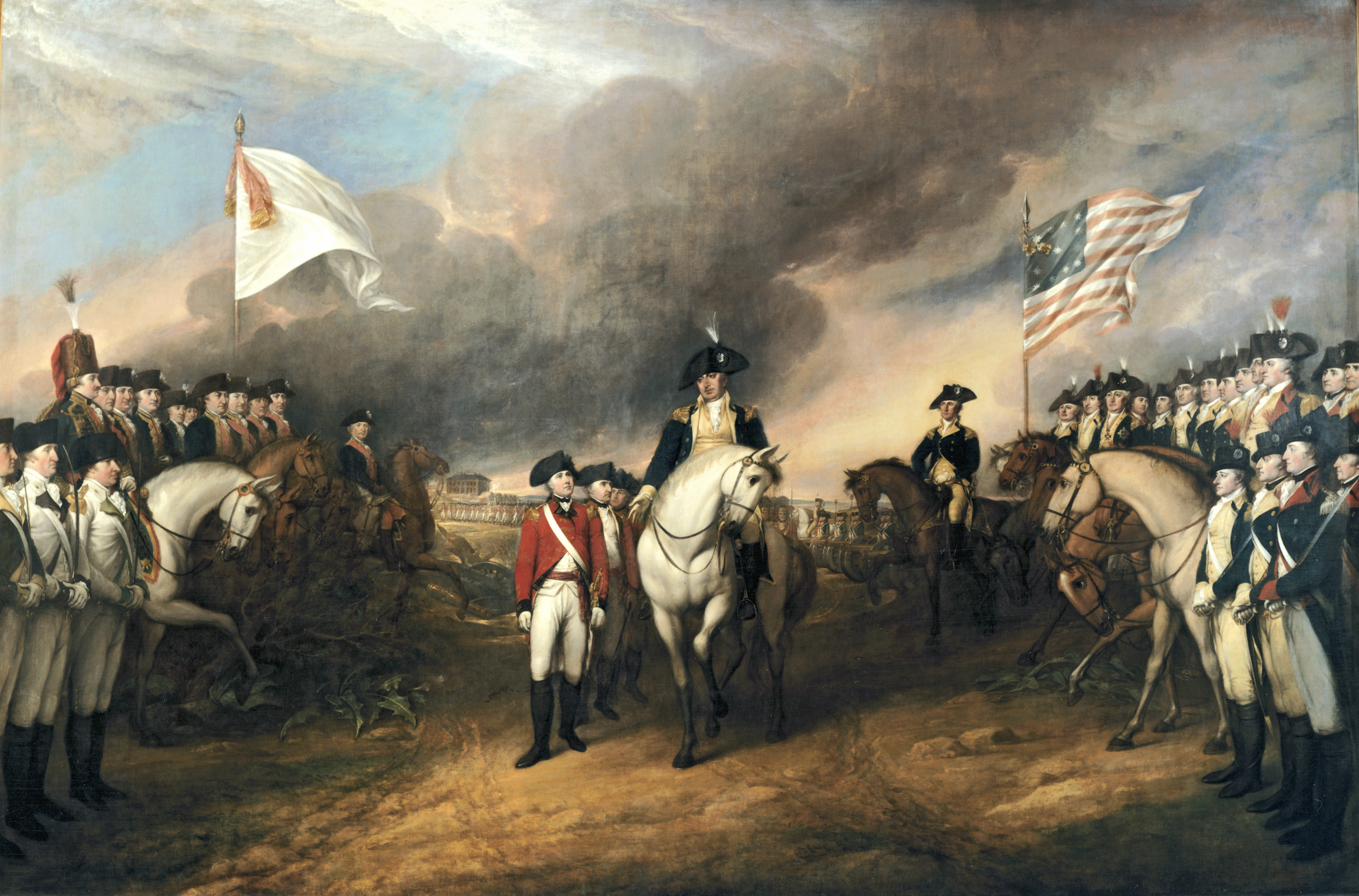
Surrender of Lord Cornwallis, an 1820 painting by John Trumbull

Upon his arrival at Yorktown Washington had command of 5,700 Continentals, 3,200 militia and 7,800 French regulars. On September 28 the Franco-American army blockaded Yorktown, and began digging siege trenches on October 6. By the 9th guns had been emplaced on the first parallel, and began firing on the entrenched British camp. Work proceeded rapidly thereafter on the second parallel, only 300 yards (270 m) from the British defenses. On the 14th two outer redoubts of the British defenses were stormed, and the entirety of the British camp was with range of the French and American cannons. After a failed attempt to escape across the York River, Cornwallis opened negotiations on October 17. Two days later terms were agreed, and his 8,000 men paraded in surrender. Despite the size of the contending forces, and the importance of the siege, there were only 260 allied and 550 British casualties. One of the American casualties was Washington's stepson and aide-de-camp John Parke Custis, who died of a camp disease during the siege.

The disaster at Yorktown broke the morale of the governing class in London and paralyzed Britain's national will to make war. The war party in Britain lost control of Parliament, and the new government opened peace talks. These came to fruition in 1783 with the Treaty of Paris, in which Britain recognized American independence.

== Waiting for peace ==
Following Yorktown, Washington's army returned to New York, while Rochambeau's remained in Virginia. Washington, concerned that Congress "may think our work too nearly closed", worked to make sure that the army would be prepared for a campaign in 1782. Although British ship movements caused Washington some concerns during the winter of 1781–2, he was able to enjoy relative comfort in Philadelphia. He returned to his headquarters in Newburgh, New York, in March 1782, where he had to deal with greedy military supply contractors. The execution of militia officer Joshua Huddy by Loyalists occasioned an exchange between Washington and Clinton, and led to the so-called "Asgill Affair", after the officer selected to be executed in retaliation for Huddy's hanging. Despite the onset of peace negotiations in the second half of 1782, Washington remained vigilant, treating with suspicion assertions on the part of General Clinton's replacement, Sir Guy Carleton, that he had suspended "all hostilities". To boost morale, Washington introduced the Badge of Military Merit, to be awarded for "unusual gallantry" or "extraordinary fidelity and essential service". The badge, a purple-colored cloth in the shape of a heart, is a precursor to the modern American Purple Heart.

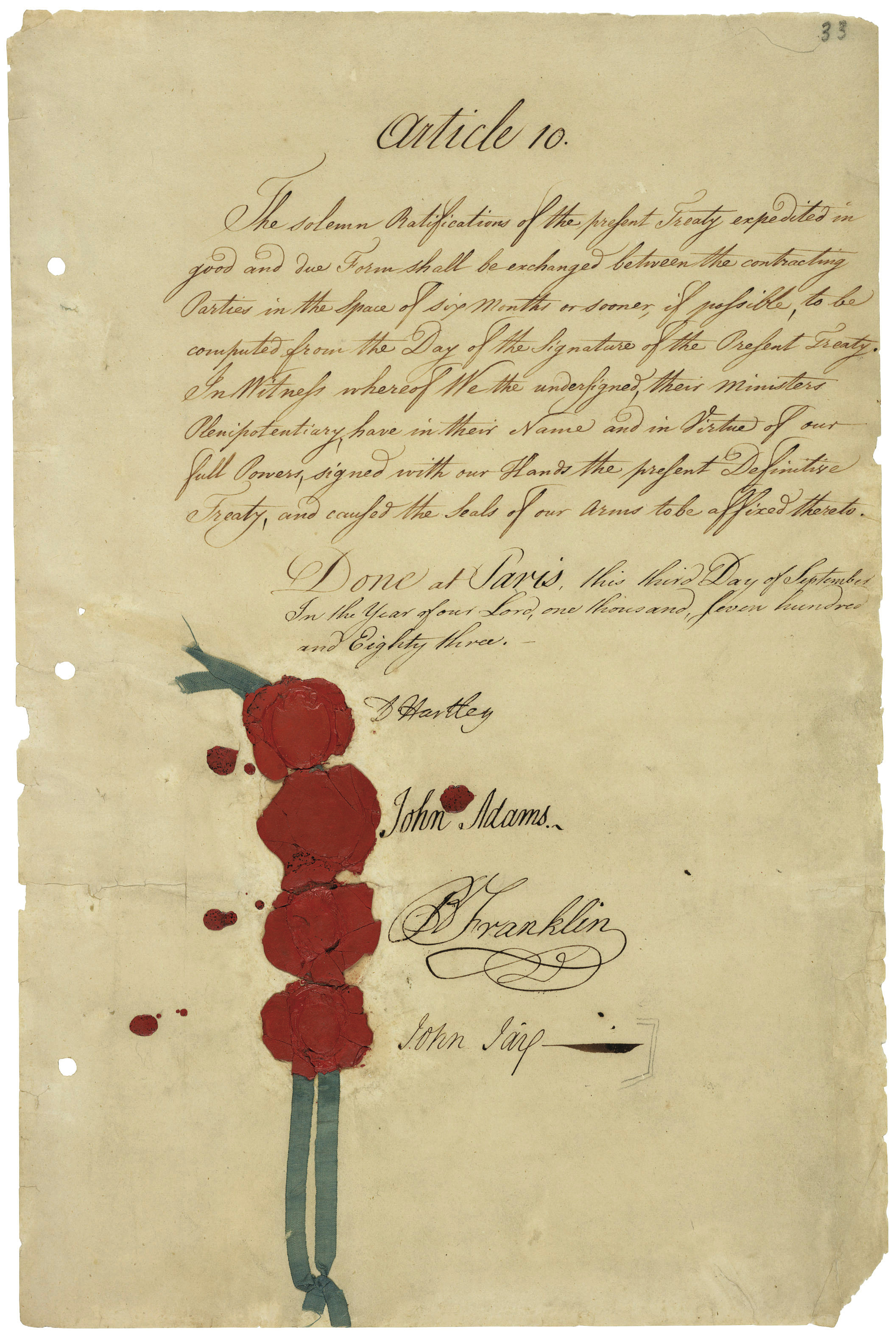
Page of the draft peace treaty signed September 3, 1783

In 1783, Washington continued to keep the army ready at Newburgh, although some of his officers made veiled threats to Congress about long-overdue pay. Washington diffused this hint at mutiny with an address to the troops on March 15 recommending patience. On March 26 he was informed that France and Spain had made peace with Britain, one of the last preconditions for a final peace. Thereafter he was occupied with the logistics of prisoner exchanges, and pressed Congress to ensure soldiers being furloughed or discharged received at least some of their back pay. Washington met with Carleton to discuss the Treaty of Paris, during which he pressed Carleton to support the return of fugitive slaves which had joined the British to their American enslavers. Carleton refused to budge and informed Washington, much to his chagrin, that the British had transported 6,000 formerly enslaved Black people to Nova Scotia and he would refuse to support any effort by Americans to re-enslave their former property. In June, nearly 400 Continental Army soldiers in Pennsylvania mutinied, marching on Philadelphia and surrounding the State House where Congress sat. In response, Congress temporarily relocated to Princeton, and Washington dispatched troops south from New York. After action by Congress addressed their concerns, the mutineers returned to their posts.

The Treaty of Paris was signed on September 3, 1783. On November 25, the British evacuated New York City, and Washington and Governor George Clinton took possession of the city, ending large-scale British occupation of American territory. (Britain continued to occupy frontier forts that had been ceded to the United States until the mid-1790s.)

== Resignation and post-war career ==
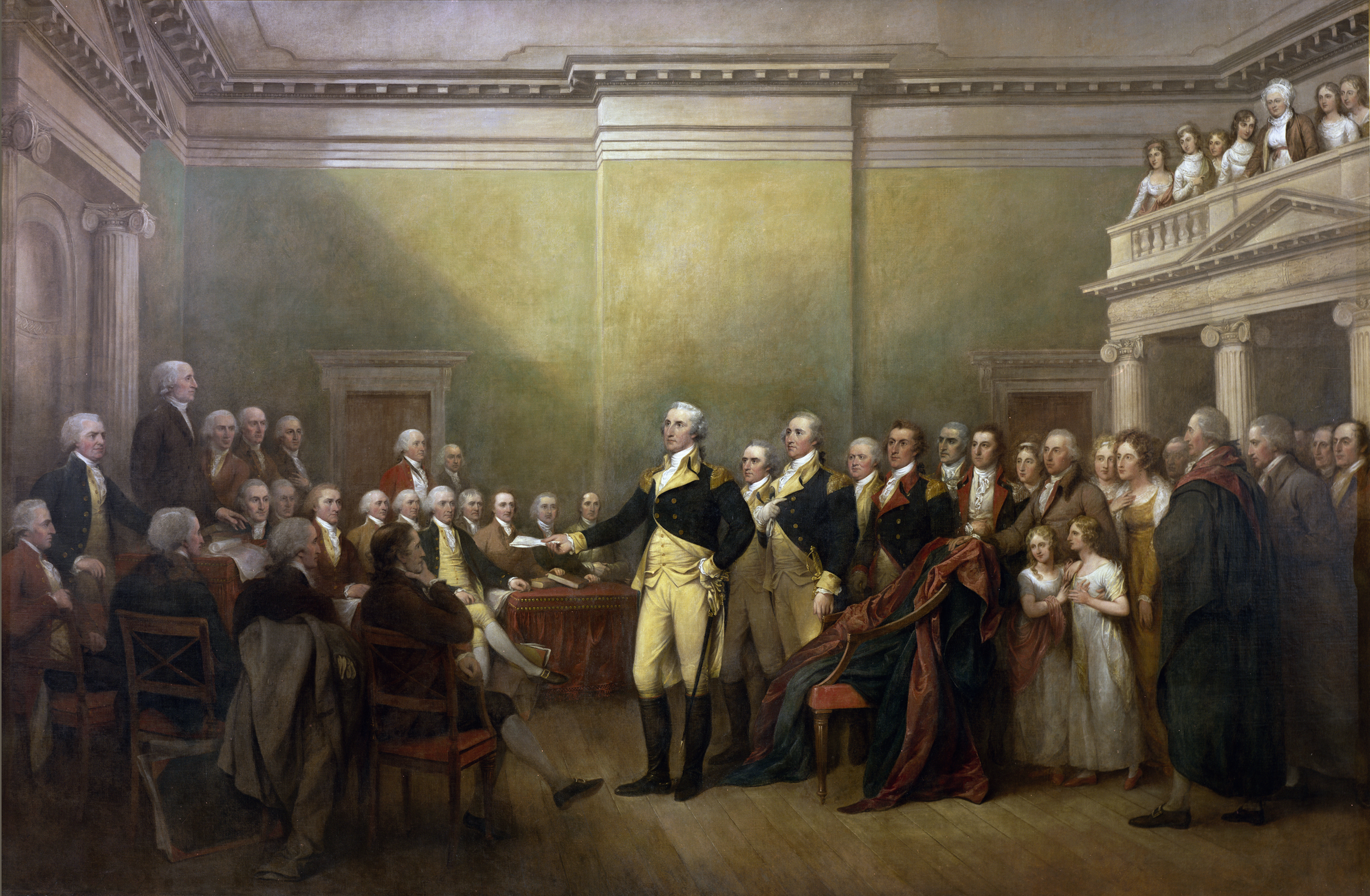
General George Washington Resigning His Commission, a painting by John Trumbull

Washington's contribution to victory in the war was not that of a great battlefield tactician. He has been characterized, according to historian Edward G. Lengel, in many different ways: "charismatic hero, master of guerrilla warfare, incompetent or infallible battlefield commander, strategic genius, nationalist visionary, fanatical micromanager, and lucky dog". Although he has frequently been said to engage in the Fabian strategy of wearing his opponent down, the truth is more nuanced. On a number of occasions his subordinates convinced him to hold off on plans of attack they saw as rash. Washington only really adopted a Fabian strategy between late 1776 and the middle of 1777, after losing New York City and seeing much of his army melt away. Trenton and Princeton were Fabian examples. By August 1777, however, Washington had rebuilt his strength and his confidence and stopped using raids and went for large-scale confrontations, as at Brandywine, Germantown, Monmouth and Yorktown.

Washington is often characterized as complaining about undisciplined militia forces, but he understood that they were a vital part of the nation's defenses, since regular army troops could not be everywhere. He was also at times critical of the mercenary spirit and "the dearth of public spirit" that often underlay difficulties in recruiting for the army.

One of Washington's important contributions as commander-in-chief was to establish the precedent that elected civilian officials, rather than military officers, possessed ultimate authority over the military. Throughout the war, he deferred to the authority of Congress and state officials, and he relinquished his considerable military power once the fighting was over. This principle was especially visible in his handling of the Newburgh conspiracy, and in his "Farewell Orders". The latter document was written at his final wartime headquarters, a house on the outskirts of Princeton owned by the widow Berrien (later to be called Rockingham), but was sent to be read to the assembled troops at West Point on November 2. At Fraunces Tavern in New York City on December 4, he formally bade his officers farewell. On December 23, 1783, Washington resigned his commission as commander-in-chief to the Congress of the Confederation at Annapolis, Maryland, and retired to his home at Mount Vernon. Washington also became the first President General of the Society of the Cincinnati.

After the war Washington chaired the Constitutional Convention that drafted the United States Constitution, and was then elected the first President of the United States, serving two terms. He briefly engaged in additional military service during a threatened war with France in 1798, and died in December 1799. He is widely recognized as the "Father of his country".

In 2012, a poll conducted by the British National Army Museum recognized Washington as "Britain's Greatest Military Enemy." He beat out Atatürk, Irish independence hero Michael Collins, Erwin Rommel, and Napoleon.

== See also ==
- List of George Washington articles
- List of Washington's Headquarters during the Revolutionary War
- Bibliography of George Washington
- Commander-in-Chief's Guard in the American Revolution
- Haym Solomon
- Robert Morris
