= David Charpentier de Cossigny =

French politician (1740–1801)

David Charpentier de Cossigny was Governor General of Pondicherry, Réunion and Isle de France (now Mauritius). He was born in Gaillac in the Tarn on 9 February 1740. He is member of a famous family of the Isle de France that includes scientists and soldiers.

== Early life ==
On December 1, 1777, David Charpentier de Cossigny was lieutenant-colonel of the colonial regiment of the Isle of France. During the American War of Independence, he distinguished himself in India.

In 1781, he was appointed to be part of the Indian expedition, under the orders of General Duchemin, commanding a detachment of 848 men from the Isle of France regiment, embarked and embarked himself on the squadron of which Le Bailli de Suffren took command after the death of the squadron chief of Orves.

On February 17, 1782, David Charpentier de Cossigny was on the ship the Sphinx, in naval combat that took place in front of Sadras. His feats earned him the rank of colonel in 1784, before being appointed Governor of Pondicherry the same year.

On March 9, 1788, David Charpentier de Cossigny was governor of Bourbon.

Upon his arrival, he discovered a situation that he considered bad and deplored the disorder that prevails. It is therefore appropriate for the governor to restore order in the colony and the new governor is working on the task. He undertook two major inspection tours on the island.

A new organization of neighborhoods is stopped. Repos-de-Laleu is separated from Saint-Paul, and Sainte-Rose de Saint-Benoît.

Neighborhood commanders are invited to exercise their full authority. Colonial troops that had not been reviewed for four or five years are put back in order.

== Death ==
He died in 1801. He was succeeded by Thomas Conway, who was a Revolutionary general in 1777.

Government offices
| Preceded by Élie Dioré | Governor General of Réunion; 21 February 1788–15 August 1790 | Succeeded by Prosper de Chermont |
| Preceded by Le Vicomte, François de Souillac | Gouverneur Général de l'Inde française 15 August 1785–1787 | Succeeded by Thomas Conway, Comte de |
| Preceded by Prosper de Chermont (Acting) | Governor General of Mascarene Islands; 19 August 1790–18 June 1792 | Succeeded by Anne Joseph Hippolyte de Maurès, Comte de Malartic |
