= Thomas Conway =

Irish-born army officer and colonial administrator

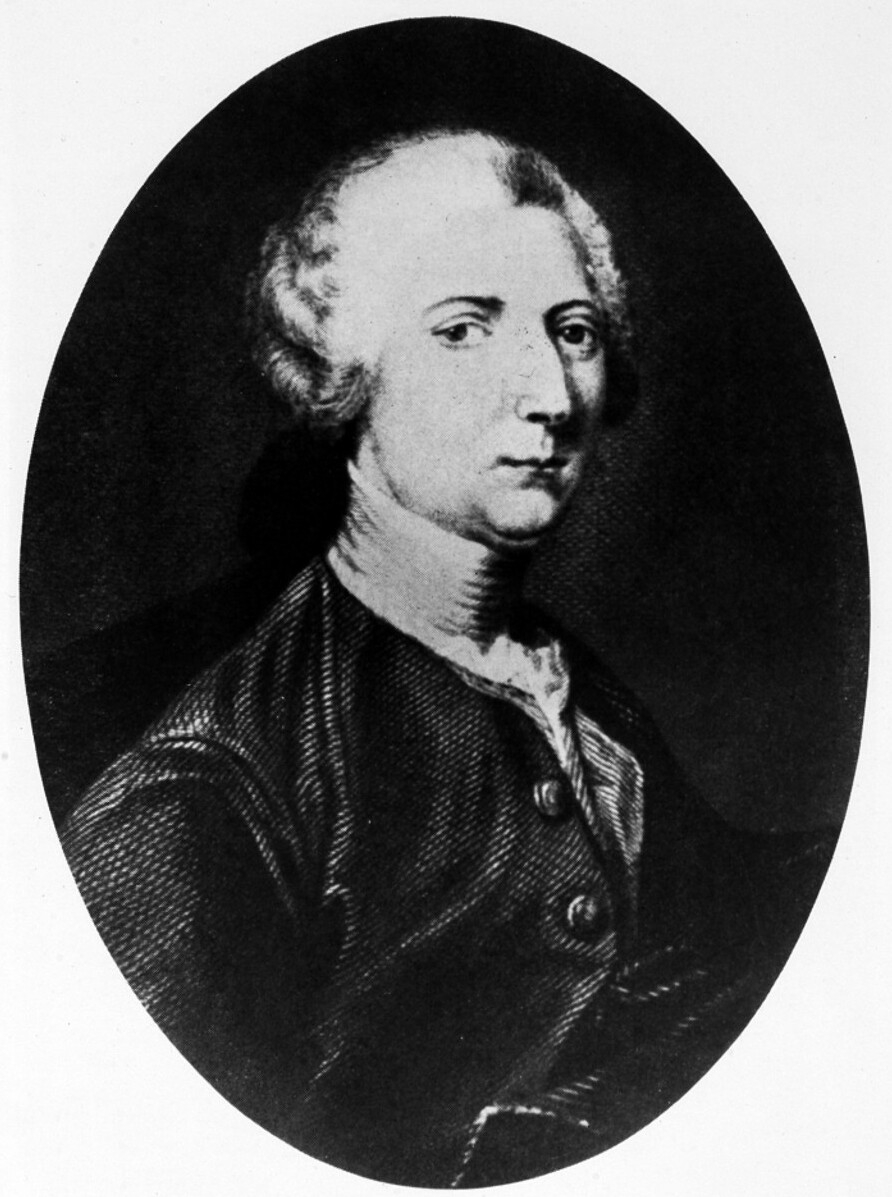
- Born: February 27, 1735; County Kerry, Ireland
- Died: March, 1795 (aged 59–60); Bath, Somerset
- Burial place: Bath Abbey
- Spouse: Francoise Antoinette Jeanne Florimonde Langlois du Bouchet Conway
- Children: 1
- Military career
- Allegiance: France; United States
- Service years: 1749–1777 (France); 1777–1778 (United States); 1778–1789 (France)
- Rank: Major general
- Units: French Army; Continental Army
- Commands: Inspector General of the Continental Army; Gouverneur Général de l'Inde française
- Conflicts: American Revolutionary War; Battle of Germantown; French Revolutionary Wars

Thomas Conway (February 27, 1735 – March 1795) was an Irish-born army officer and colonial administrator who served as the governor of French India from 1787 to 1789. Over the course of his military career, he served in the French Royal Army, the Continental Army, and British Army and fought in the American Revolutionary War and the French Revolutionary Wars. During the American Revolutionary War, Conway was involved with the alleged Conway Cabal with Horatio Gates, resulting in his dismissal from the Continental Army.

== Early life ==
Thomas Conway was born in County Kerry, Ireland to James Conway and his wife Julieanne Conway. Though born to a Catholic family, it is unclear how closely he adhered to the faith. As a child, he immigrated to France with his parents. At the age of 14, he joined the French Royal Army's Irish Brigade and rose to the rank of colonel by 1772.

== Arrival in America ==
Following the outbreak of the American Revolutionary War he went to the Thirteen Colonies and volunteered to join to the Continental Congress for military service in 1777. Based on an introduction from Silas Deane, Congress appointed him as a brigadier general in the Continental Army on May 13, and sent him on to George Washington.

Conway commanded the leading brigade on the American right flank at the Battle of Germantown, and was praised for his actions. However, Washington opposed his promotion to major general, believing that many American-born officers with longer and valuable service deserved the rank; this caused a falling out between Washington and Conway. Congress appointed Conway a major general despite Washington's objections in December 1777, and made him Inspector General of the American army.

== Conway Cabal ==
When his name was used politically, it was used to describe the infighting known as the Conway Cabal. During the affair, he had written a letter to Horatio Gates in which he referred to Washington as a "weak general," criticizing General Washington's failed tactics against British General William Howe. The letter stated: "Heaven has been determined to save your country; or a weak general [George Washington] and bad counselors would have ruined it." The letter was intercepted by Washington and his backers after its delivery was botched by Brigadier-General James Wilkinson, and brought before the Congress for inquiry. When the contents of the letter were made public, Conway lost his command as a result. He tried a ploy that had worked before his promotion, and submitted his resignation to Congress in March 1778. This time it was accepted, so he was forced to leave the Continental Army.

Shortly after this, General John Cadwalader challenged Conway to a duel. Cadwalader was a supporter of Washington's who had been with him at Valley Forge, and was angered by Conway's disloyal conduct. The duel was fought with pistols on July 4, 1778. At a distance of 12 paces, Conway fired first and missed. Cadwalader's shot struck Conway in the mouth and passed through the back of his head. Cadwalader, regarding Conway lying on the ground in agony, supposedly observed: "I have stopped the damned rascal's lying anyway."

Conway miraculously survived his wound. When he was not expecting to live, Conway penned a letter of apology to Washington, which read as follows:

Dear Sir: I find myself just able to hold my pen during a few minutes, and take this opportunity of expressing my sincere grief for having done, written, or said anything disagreeable to your Excellency. My career will soon be over; therefore, justice and truth prompt me to declare my last sentiments. You are in my eyes the great and good man. May you long enjoy the love, esteem, and veneration of these States, whose liberties you have asserted by your virtues.

== Later life ==
Conway later returned to the French army, where in 1787 he was promoted to maréchal de camp and appointed as the governor of French India. In 1793 he fought with royalist forces in opposition to French Revolution in southern France. During the French Revolution he was condemned to death. He was saved only by an appeal to the British (against which he had fought in the American Revolutionary War), but was compelled to flee from France for his life.

Having been aided by the British government, in 1794 Conway was named colonel of one of the six regiments of the British Army's Catholic Irish Brigade, formed by Prime Minister William Pitt the Younger. Although people in positions of authority remained impressed with his military accomplishments, he continued to suffer from ill health. He visited Bath, Somerset on several occasions in the hopes of improving his health; the Bath Chronicle recorded his arrival for the final time on February 12, 1795. He died soon after and was interred in Bath Abbey on March 3; the exact location of his memorial is unknown due to major renovations conducted in the 1860s.

Conway was survived by his wife, Francois Antoinette Langlois du Bouchet who was created the Contesse de Conway, whom he married on June 1, 1775 and had a daughter the following year, on July 12, 1776, named Caroline. The Countess lived until 1828 and as a widow of a British Army colonel she continued to receive a government pension.

Military offices
Preceded by Philippe Charles Tronson du Coudray	Inspector General of the United States Army; December 13, 1777–April 28, 1778	Succeeded by Friedrich Wilhelm von Steuben
Government offices
Preceded by David Charpentier de Cossigny	Governor of French India; October 1787–1789	Succeeded by Camille Charles Leclerc, Chevalier de Fresne
Preceded by Antoine Bruni d'Entrecasteaux	Governor of Isle de France; 14 November 1789–29 July 1790	Succeeded by Dominique Prosper de Chermont
