= National Register of Historic Places listings in Somerset County, New Jersey =

Location of Somerset County in New Jersey

List of the National Register of Historic Places listings in Somerset County, New Jersey

Contents: Counties and communities in New Jersey
Atlantic – Bergen (Closter, Franklin Lakes, Ridgewood, Saddle River, Wyckoff) – Burlington – Camden – Cape May – Cumberland – Essex – Gloucester – Hudson – Hunterdon – Mercer – Middlesex – Monmouth – Morris – Ocean – Passaic – Salem – Somerset – Sussex – Union – Warren

This is intended to be a complete list of properties and districts listed on the National Register of Historic Places in Somerset County, New Jersey. Latitude and longitude coordinates of the sites listed on this page may be displayed in an online map.

This National Park Service list is complete through NPS recent listings posted July 31, 2026.

	Name on the Register	Image	Date listed	Location	City or town	Description
1	Alward Farmhouse	Alward Farmhouse	March 13, 1986 (#86000388)	40 Mt. Airy Rd. 40°41′39″N 74°34′34″W	Basking Ridge	
2	Baker–Duderstadt Farm	Baker–Duderstadt Farm	November 26, 2008 (#08001109)	30 DuBois Road; 40°38′03″N 74°29′50″W	Warren Township	
3	Basking Ridge Classical School	Basking Ridge Classical School	July 21, 1976 (#76001185)	15 W. Oak Street; 40°42′24″N 74°33′00″W	Basking Ridge	
4	Bedens Brook Bridge	Bedens Brook Bridge	February 17, 1994 (#94000010)	Opossum Rd., 0.1 miles (0.16 km) south of Orchard Rd., over Bedens's Brook, Montgomery Township; 40°24′56″N 74°39′51″W	Montgomery Township	
5	Bedens Brook Road Bridge	Bedens Brook Road Bridge	February 18, 1994 (#94000011)	Beden's Brook Rd., 0.1 miles (0.16 km) east of Province Line Rd., over branch of Beden's Brook, Montgomery Township; 40°23′40″N 74°43′47″W	Stoutsburg	
6	Bernardsville Station	Bernardsville Station	June 22, 1984 (#84002786)	U.S. Route 202; 40°43′01″N 74°34′18″W	Bernardsville	part of the Operating Passenger Railroad Stations TR
7	Blawenburg Historic District	Blawenburg Historic District	December 7, 1990 (#88000632)	Georgetown-Franklin Turnpike/CR 588, Great Road/CR 601, and Mountain View Road; 40°24′29″N 74°42′09″W	Blawenburg	Includes Reformed Dutch Church of Blawenburg
8	Boudinot–Southard Farmstead	Boudinot–Southard Farmstead	December 18, 2009 (#09001101)	135 N. Maple Avenue; 40°42′55″N 74°32′32″W	Bernards Township	Known as the Ross Farm
9	Bound Brook Station	Bound Brook Station	June 22, 1984 (#84002787)	E. Main St. 40°33′39″N 74°31′51″W	Bound Brook	part of the Operating Passenger Railroad Stations TR
10	Bridgepoint Historic District	Bridgepoint Historic District	June 10, 1975 (#75001161)	North of Rocky Hill along Bridgepoint and Dead Tree Run roads 40°25′46″N 74°38′55″W	Montgomery Township	
11	Brook Theater	Brook Theater	May 5, 2014 (#14000190)	10 Hamilton Street; 40°33′43″N 74°31′48″W	Bound Brook	Known as Brook Arts Center
12	Cat Tail Brook Bridge	Cat Tail Brook Bridge	August 1, 1979 (#79001520)	Northwest of Rocky Hill on Montgomery Rd; 40°26′28″N 74°44′37″W	Rocky Hill	
13	Clover Hill Historic District	Clover Hill Historic District	September 29, 1980 (#80002492)	Amwell and Wertsville-Clover Hill Roads; 40°29′14″N 74°47′01″W	Clover Hill	Extends into Hunterdon County
14	Coffee House	Coffee House	November 7, 1977 (#77000906)	214 N. Maple Ave. 40°43′11″N 74°32′30″W	Basking Ridge	
15	Moses Craig Limekilns	Moses Craig Limekilns	April 11, 2019 (#100003610)	122 Main Street; 40°42′44″N 74°39′27″W	Peapack-Gladstone	
16	Delaware and Raritan Canal	Delaware and Raritan Canal	May 11, 1973 (#73001105)	Follows the Delaware River to Trenton, then E to New Brunswick; 40°32′40″N 75°02′50″W	Somerville	
17	East Millstone Historic District	East Millstone Historic District	March 17, 1983 (#83001613)	Amwell Road and Delaware & Raritan Canal; 40°30′04″N 74°34′50″W	East Millstone	
18	Elmendorf House	Elmendorf House	April 16, 1992 (#92000378)	1246 Millstone River Rd., Hillsborough Township; 40°30′43″N 74°35′17″W	Millstone	
19	Far Hills Station	Far Hills Station	June 22, 1984 (#84002789)	U.S. Route 202; 40°41′08″N 74°38′03″W	Far Hills	part of the Operating Passenger Railroad Stations TR
20	Franklin Corners Historic District	Franklin Corners Historic District	May 12, 1975 (#75001159)	Along Hardscrabble and Childs Roads; 40°43′59″N 74°32′48″W	Franklin Corners	
21	General John Frelinghuysen House	General John Frelinghuysen House	March 4, 1971 (#71000513)	Somerset St. and Wyckoff Ave. 40°34′05″N 74°37′46″W	Raritan	
22	Gladstone Station	Gladstone Station	June 22, 1984 (#84002792)	Main St. 40°43′12″N 74°39′58″W	Gladstone	part of the Operating Passenger Railroad Stations TR
23	Griggstown Historic District	Griggstown Historic District	August 2, 1984 (#84002798)	Roughly Canal Road from Old Georgetown Road to Ten Mile Run; 40°25′46″N 74°36′52″W	Griggstown	
24	Dirck Gulick House	Dirck Gulick House	December 11, 2003 (#03001285)	506 Belle Mead-Blawenburg Road; 40°26′54″N 74°41′24″W	Montgomery Township	
25	Hamilton Farm Stable Complex	Hamilton Farm Stable Complex	May 18, 2018 (#100001243)	1040 Pottersville Rd. 40°43′08″N 74°41′15″W	Bedminster	
26	Higginsville Road Bridges	Higginsville Road Bridges	August 10, 2000 (#00000916)	Higginsville Rd. at the South Branch of the Raritan River; 40°30′33″N 74°47′08″W	Hillsborough	
27	Huff House and Farmstead	Huff House and Farmstead	November 7, 1976 (#76001186)	River Road at the South Branch Raritan River, near Flagtown; 40°31′02″N 74°43′21″W	Hillsborough Township	
28	Kennedy–Martin–Stelle Farmstead	Kennedy–Martin–Stelle Farmstead	May 5, 2004 (#03000868)	450 King George Road; 40°39′29″N 74°31′44″W	Bernards Township	
29	King's Highway Historic District	King's Highway Historic District	December 21, 2000 (#00001493)	NJ 27, US 206; 40°22′21″N 74°37′06″W	Franklin	Extends into Mercer and Middlesex Counties
30	Kingston Mill Historic District	Kingston Mill Historic District	April 10, 1986 (#86000707)	Roughly bounded by Herrontown, River, Princeton-Kingston Roads; 40°22′28″N 74°37′34″W	Franklin	Extends into Mercer and Middlesex Counties, includes Kingston Bridge
31	Kingston Village Historic District	Kingston Village Historic District	January 11, 1990 (#89002163)	Roughly New Jersey Route 27 from Raymond Rd. to Delaware & Raritan Canal, Church St., Laurel Ave., Heathcote Brook Rd., & Academy St. 40°22′33″N 74°36′48″W	Kingston	Extends into Middlesex County
32	Kirch–Ford House	Kirch–Ford House	October 20, 1988 (#88002033)	1 Reinman Road; 40°38′03″N 74°30′11″W	Warren Township	
33	Lamington Historic District	Lamington Historic District	June 21, 1984 (#84002802)	Lamington, Black River, Rattlesnake Bridge, and Cowperthwaite Roads; 40°39′38″N 74°43′03″W	Lamington	
34	Liberty Corner Historic District	Liberty Corner Historic District	October 11, 1991 (#91001477)	Roughly, the junction of Church Street and Valley and Lyons Roads, and the area west and southwest 40°39′54″N 74°34′51″W	Liberty Corner	
35	Alexander and James Linn Homestead	Alexander and James Linn Homestead	October 27, 1988 (#88002057)	U.S. Route 202 (Mine Brook Road), between Sunnybranch and Lake Roads; 40°41′31″N 74°37′48″W	Far Hills	
36	Lyons Station	Lyons Station	June 22, 1984 (#84002805)	Lyons Rd. 40°41′05″N 74°33′00″W	Lyons	part of the Operating Passenger Railroad Stations TR
37	Lyons Veterans Administration Hospital Historic District	Lyons Veterans Administration Hospital Historic District	July 3, 2013 (#13000461)	151 Knollcroft Road; 40°40′11″N 74°33′19″W	Lyons	Known as Lyons VA Medical Center, part of United States Second Generation Veterans Hospitals MPS
38	Maplewood	Maplewood	August 24, 2000 (#00000960)	Burnt Hill Road at Rock Brook; 40°24′50″N 74°41′02″W	Montgomery Township	destroyed by fire in 2011
39	McDonald's–Kline's Mill	McDonald's–Kline's Mill	March 9, 1987 (#87000410)	Address Restricted	Bedminster	
40	The Meadows	The Meadows	December 4, 1973 (#73001134)	1289 Easton Ave. 40°31′22″N 74°29′36″W	Franklin	Known as Van Wickle House
41	Middlebrook Encampment Site	Middlebrook Encampment Site	July 3, 1975 (#75001160)	Middlebrook Road; 40°34′45″N 74°32′16″W	Bridgewater Township	
42	Middlebush Village Historic District	Middlebush Village Historic District	April 24, 2007 (#07000354)	Amwell Road, S. Middlebush Road, Railroad Avenue, Olcott Street, and Debow Street; 40°29′44″N 74°31′44″W	Franklin	Includes Middlebush Reformed Church
43	Millstone Historic District	Millstone Historic District	September 13, 1976 (#76001188)	Amwell and River Roads; 40°29′56″N 74°35′18″W	Millstone	
44	Millstone Valley Agricultural District	Millstone Valley Agricultural District	August 10, 1977 (#77000907)	South of Millstone on River Road; 40°28′52″N 74°34′50″W	Hillsborough	
45	Morristown National Historical Park	Morristown National Historical Park	October 15, 1966 (#66000053)	Jockey Hollow Road; 40°44′53″N 74°33′34″W	Bernardsville	New Jersey Brigade Encampment Site in Somerset County
46	Mount Bethel Baptist Meetinghouse	Mount Bethel Baptist Meetinghouse	June 3, 1976 (#76001187)	About 2 miles (3.2 km) north of Martinsville off Interstate 78; 40°38′17″N 74°30′53″W	Warren Township	
47	Mount Zion African Methodist Episcopal Church	Mount Zion African Methodist Episcopal Church	June 7, 2021 (#100006611)	189 Hollow Road; 40°25′02″N 74°43′16″W	Montgomery Township	Home to the Stoutsburg Sourland African American Museum
48	Neshanic Historic District	Neshanic Historic District	August 1, 1979 (#79001519)	Amwell and Zion Roads; 40°29′54″N 74°43′12″W	Neshanic	
49	Neshanic Mills	Neshanic Mills	January 9, 1978 (#78001797)	River Road and Mill Lane; 40°30′31″N 74°43′33″W	Neshanic Station	
50	Neshanic Station Historic District	Neshanic Station Historic District	February 8, 2016 (#15001051)	Maple Avenue, Fairview Drive; Elm, Olive, Pearl, Main, and Marshall Streets; Woodfern Road; 40°30′31″N 74°43′54″W	Neshanic Station	
51	North Branch Historic District	North Branch Historic District	April 16, 2012 (#12000209)	Easton Turnpike, Vanderveer Avenue, Burnt Mill and Station Roads; 40°36′10″N 74°40′42″W	North Branch	
52	Olcott Avenue Historic District	Olcott Avenue Historic District	November 20, 2009 (#09000940)	Portions of Olcott, Childsworth, and Highview Avenues, and Church Street; 40°43′18″N 74°34′03″W	Bernardsville	
53	Old Dutch Parsonage	Old Dutch Parsonage	January 25, 1971 (#71000514)	65 Washington Place; 40°34′05″N 74°37′23″W	Somerville	
54	Old Stone Arch Bridge	Old Stone Arch Bridge	June 27, 2008 (#08000550)	Railroad Ave., approximately 194 feet east of South Main St. 40°33′37″N 74°31′36″W	Bound Brook	
55	John Parker Tavern	John Parker Tavern	December 14, 1978 (#78001796)	2 Morristown Road; 40°43′07″N 74°34′06″W	Bernardsville	
56	Pluckemin Village Historic District	Pluckemin Village Historic District	July 26, 1982 (#82003303)	U.S. Route 206 and Burnt Mills Road; 40°38′48″N 74°38′24″W	Pluckemin	
57	Pluckemin Continental Artillery Cantonment Site	Pluckemin Continental Artillery Cantonment Site	March 14, 2008 (#08000180)	Junction of U.S. Routes 202 and 206, north of River Rd., Bedminster Twp. 40°40′02″N 74°39′05″W	Pluckemin	
58	Pottersville Village Historic District	Pottersville Village Historic District	September 18, 1990 (#90001475)	Properties fronting on Black River, Pottersville, McCann Mill and Hacklebarney Roads, Fairmount Road East and High Street; 40°42′52″N 74°43′15″W	Pottersville	Extends into Hunterdon and Morris Counties
59	Presbyterian Church at Bound Brook	Presbyterian Church at Bound Brook	August 28, 2007 (#07000876)	409 Mountain Ave. 40°34′01″N 74°31′52″W	Bound Brook	
60	Presbyterian Church in Basking Ridge	Presbyterian Church in Basking Ridge	December 31, 1974 (#74001190)	6 E. Oak St. 40°42′26″N 74°32′39″W	Basking Ridge	
61	Raritan Bridge	Raritan Bridge	November 12, 1992 (#92001526)	Nevius Street over the Raritan River, Raritan Borough and Hillsborough Township; 40°33′53″N 74°38′09″W	Raritan	Known as Nevius Street Bridge
62	Raritan Station	Raritan Station	June 22, 1984 (#84002824)	Anderson and Thompson Sts. 40°34′14″N 74°38′04″W	Raritan	part of the Operating Passenger Railroad Stations TR
63	Reformed Dutch Church of Blawenburg	Reformed Dutch Church of Blawenburg	September 5, 1985 (#85002004)	424 CR 518; 40°24′30″N 74°41′57″W	Blawenburg	Known as Blawenburg Reformed Church
64	Relief Hose Company No. 2 Engine House	Relief Hose Company No. 2 Engine House	December 14, 2000 (#00001466)	16 Anderson Street; 40°34′07″N 74°38′03″W	Raritan	
65	Reynolds–Scherman House	Reynolds–Scherman House	April 29, 1989 (#89000298)	71 Hardscrabble Road; 40°44′22″N 74°33′27″W	Bernardsville	
66	River Road Historic Rural District	River Road Historic Rural District	March 21, 1991 (#91000256)	Millstone River Road from Hillsborough Road to Van Horne Road; 40°26′16″N 74°37′09″W	Hillsborough, Montgomery	
67	Daniel Robert House	Daniel Robert House	March 5, 2008 (#08000137)	25 West End Avenue; 40°34′14″N 74°37′11″W	Somerville	Serves as Somerville Borough Hall and Somerville Public Library
68	Rock Brook Bridge	Rock Brook Bridge	February 18, 1994 (#94000012)	Junction of Long Hill and Dutchtown-Zion Rds. over Cat Tail Brook, Montgomery and Hillsborough Townships; 40°26′22″N 74°44′23″W	Zion	
69	Rockingham	Rockingham	December 18, 1970 (#70000394)	84 Laurel Avenue (Route 603); 40°23′03″N 74°37′08″W	Franklin	Judge John Berrien House, George Washington's Headquarters in 1783, originally at Rocky Hill, relocated near Kingston in 2001
70	Rocky Hill Historic District	Rocky Hill Historic District	July 8, 1982 (#82003304)	Washington Street; Montgomery, Crescent, and Princeton Avenues; 40°24′01″N 74°38′15″W	Rocky Hill	
71	St. Bernard's Church and Parish House	St. Bernard's Church and Parish House	September 6, 2006 (#06000761)	88 Claremont Road; 40°43′20″N 74°34′21″W	Bernardsville	
72	St. John's Church Complex	St. John's Church Complex	September 15, 2003 (#03000933)	154–158 W. High Street; 40°34′20″N 74°37′03″W	Somerville	Includes St. John's Episcopal Church, rectory, and parish hall
73	Six Mile Run Historic District	Six Mile Run Historic District	October 25, 1995 (#95001191)	Roughly bounded by Grouse Road, Amwell Road, Bennetts Lane, New Jersey Route 27, Bunker Hill Road and the Millstone River; 40°27′48″N 74°33′29″W	Franklin	
74	Six Mile Run Reformed Church	Six Mile Run Reformed Church	December 18, 2009 (#09001102)	3037 New Jersey Route 27, Franklin Park; 40°26′19″N 74°32′10″W	Franklin	
75	Smalley–Wormser House	Smalley–Wormser House	October 19, 1978 (#78001798)	West of Plainfield at 84 Mountain Ave. 40°39′30″N 74°28′28″W	Warren Township	
76	J. Harper Smith Mansion	J. Harper Smith Mansion	December 31, 1998 (#98001572)	228 Altamont Place; 40°34′29″N 74°37′14″W	Somerville	
77	Somerset Courthouse Green	Somerset Courthouse Green	September 7, 1989 (#89001216)	Roughly E. Main St. from Grove St. to N. Bridge St. 40°34′05″N 74°36′40″W	Somerville	
78	South Branch Historic District	South Branch Historic District	December 13, 1977 (#77000908)	River Road and Orchard Drive; 40°32′43″N 74°41′46″W	South Branch	
79	South Branch Schoolhouse	South Branch Schoolhouse	March 30, 2005 (#05000221)	2120 South Branch Road; 40°32′53″N 74°42′01″W	Branchburg	
80	Staats House	Staats House	December 4, 2002 (#02001483)	17 Von Steuben Lane; 40°33′06″N 74°31′16″W	South Bound Brook	Headquarters of General Friedrich Wilhelm von Steuben during the second Middlebrook encampment, 1778–79
81	Lord Stirling Manor Site	Lord Stirling Manor Site	May 22, 1978 (#78001795)	Southeast of Basking Ridge at 96 Lord Stirling Road; 40°41′39″N 74°31′50″W	Basking Ridge	
82	Andrew Ten Eyck House	Andrew Ten Eyck House	May 6, 2004 (#04000391)	671 Old York Road; 40°33′25″N 74°41′32″W	Branchburg	
83	Tulipwood	Tulipwood	September 9, 2005 (#05000966)	1165 Hamilton St. 40°29′20″N 74°29′41″W	Somerset	Known as Whitehaven Farm
84	Vail–Trust House	Vail–Trust House	October 7, 2008 (#08000972)	255 Greenbrook Road; 40°35′19″N 74°29′42″W	Green Brook	
85	Van Der Veer–Harris House	Van Der Veer–Harris House	March 12, 2008 (#08000181)	344 U.S. Route 206 (Hillsborough Township); 40°30′39″N 74°38′04″W	Woods Tavern	
86	Van Horne House	Van Horne House	March 8, 2002 (#02000133)	941 East Main Street; 40°33′42″N 74°33′05″W	Bridgewater Township	Headquarters of General William Alexander, Lord Stirling during the second Middlebrook encampment, 1778–79
87	Van Veghten House	Van Veghten House	October 10, 1979 (#79003253)	9 Van Veghten Drive; 40°33′25″N 74°35′18″W	Bridgewater Township	Headquarters of Quartermaster General Nathanael Greene during the second Middlebrook encampment, 1778–79
88	Jacobus Vanderveer House	Jacobus Vanderveer House	September 29, 1995 (#95001137)	Junction of U.S. Route 202 and U.S. Route 206, north of River Rd., Bedminster Twp. 40°40′00″N 74°38′42″W	Bedminster	Includes museum for Pluckemin Continental Artillery Cantonment Site
89	Van Derventer–Brunson House	Van Derventer–Brunson House	October 27, 2004 (#04001191)	614 Greenbrook Road; 40°36′34″N 74°27′22″W	North Plainfield	Known as Vermeule Mansion
90	Dr. John Vermeule House	Dr. John Vermeule House	February 20, 2013 (#13000024)	223 Rock Avenue; 40°36′27″N 74°27′45″W	Green Brook	
91	Vosseller's–Castner's–Allen's Tavern	Vosseller's–Castner's–Allen's Tavern	January 23, 1986 (#86000133)	664 Foothill Road; 40°36′27″N 74°37′07″W	Bridgewater Township	Known as Jacob Vosseller House
92	Wallace House	Wallace House	December 2, 1970 (#70000395)	38 Washington Place; 40°34′08″N 74°37′19″W	Somerville	Headquarters of General George Washington during the second Middlebrook encampment, 1778–79
93	Washington Park Historic District	Washington Park Historic District	April 9, 1987 (#87000603)	Roughly bounded by Green Brook Rd., Grove Ave., E. Front St., and Geraud Ave. 40°37′04″N 74°26′07″W	North Plainfield	
94	West End Hose Company Number 3	West End Hose Company Number 3	July 17, 2002 (#02000808)	15 North Doughty Avenue; 40°33′49″N 74°37′06″W	Somerville	
