= Maplewood =

Maplewood may refer to:

== Places ==
=== United States ===
==== Populated places ====
- Maplewood, Indiana
- Maplewood, Michigan
- Maplewood, Minnesota
- Maplewood, Missouri
- Maplewood, New Jersey
  - Maplewood (NJT station), a New Jersey Transit station in Maplewood, New Jersey
- Maplewood, Albany County, New York (non-CDP community/hamlet)
- Maplewood, Sullivan County, New York (non-CDP community/hamlet)
- Maplewood, Ohio
- Maplewood, Portland, Oregon, a neighborhood
- Maplewood, Houston, Texas, a neighborhood
- Maplewood, Fall River, Massachusetts (neighborhood in Fall River, Massachusetts)
- Maplewood, Virginia
- Maplewood, Washington
- Maplewood, West Virginia
- Maplewood, Wisconsin

==== Places listed on the National Register of Historic Places ====
- Maplewood (Pembroke, Kentucky), listed on the NRHP in Christian County, Kentucky
- Maplewood (Walton, Kentucky), listed on the NRHP in Boone County, Kentucky
- Maplewood (Columbia, Missouri), NRHP-listed
- Maplewood Commercial Historic District at Manchester and Sutton, Maplewood, Missouri, listed on the NRHP in St. Louis County, Missouri
- Maplewood (Montgomery Township, New Jersey), listed on the NRHP in Somerset County, New Jersey
- Maplewood Historic District, Rochester, New York, NRHP-listed
- Maplewood (Chesapeake, Ohio), listed on the NRHP in Lawrence County, Ohio
- Maplewood (Pliny, West Virginia), listed on the NRHP in Mason County, West Virginia

=== Canada ===
- Maplewood, Nova Scotia

== Other ==
- Maplewood (EP), by Ed Harcourt
- Maplewood (Milford, New Hampshire), listed on the New Hampshire State Register of Historic Places
- SS Maplewood, cargo ship sunk during World War I.

== See also ==
- Maplewood Parent Cooperative, a K-8 public school in Edmonds, Washington
- Maple Woods Community College, a campus of Metropolitan Community College in Kansas City
- Maplewood Mall, a shopping mall in Maplewood, Minnesota
- Maplewood Cemetery (disambiguation), a list of cemeteries of that name
- Maple (wood)
