= Greenwood Mountain =

Greenwood Mountain is the name of several mountain summits in the United States.

The state of Maine has two peaks:

- Piscataquis County, which climbs to 1,129 feet (344 m) above the sea level at 45.360049°N 69.390883°W 5.9 miles (9.5 km) away from the town of Monson,
- Oxford County, which climbs to 761 feet (232 m) and is located at 44.200071°N 70.379502°W 0.9 miles (1.4 km) away from the village of Hebron and circa 14 miles (23 km) far from the city of Lewiston.

The state of Minnesota has also one peak:

- Lake County, Minnesota. It is one of the lesser peaks of the Sawtooth Mountains of northeastern Minnesota, with a height of only 145 feet (44 m) above its small lake, which is at its north side.

The state of Texas has also one peak:

- Burnet County in the state of Texas. It climbs to 1,401 feet (427 m) and is located at 31.00795°N 98.427812°W, 6.7 miles (10.8 km) away from Bend.

The state of West Virginia has also two peaks:

- Fayette County, 0.8 miles (1.3 km) away of the unincorporated area of Maplewood, at 2,871 feet (875 m) of altitude and is geolocated at 37.88956°N 80.983984°W.
- Tucker County, climbs to 3,507 feet (1,069 m), and is located at 39.013163°N 79.616725°W, 2.9 miles (4.7 km) from Red Creek.
