= Bridgepoint =

Bridgepoint may refer to:

- Bridgepoint Group, a European private equity firm
- Bridgepoint Education, an American for-profit educational services holding company
  Holiday Bowl, an NCAA college football bowl game formerly known as the Bridgepoint Education Holiday Bowl
- Bridgepoint Health, a Toronto hospital and research centre
- Bridgepoint Historic District, listed on the NRHP in Somerset County, New Jersey
