= West End Hose Company Number 3 =

- U.S. National Register of Historic Places
- New Jersey Register of Historic Places
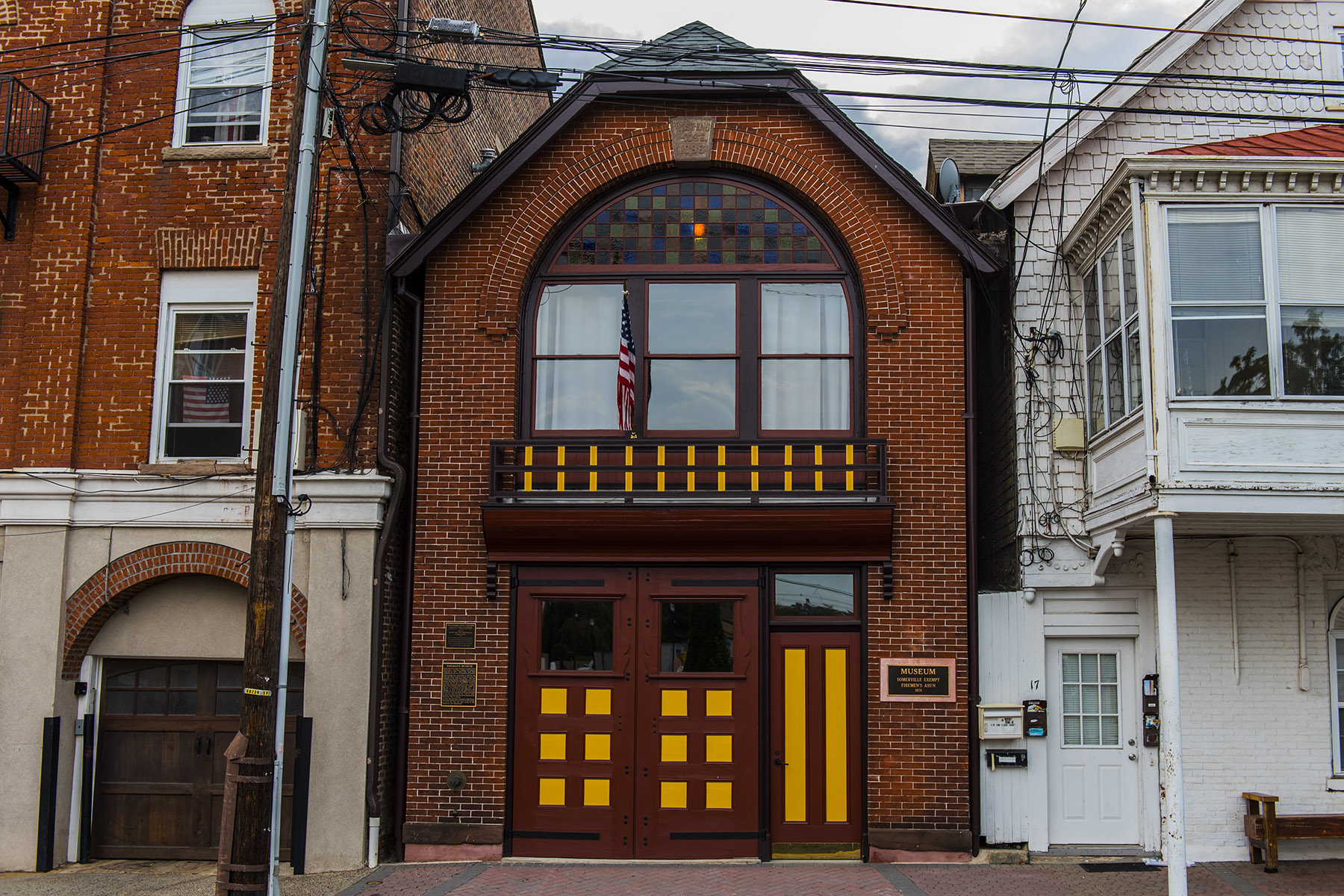
- Firehouse in 2016

- Location within Somerset County, New Jersey Location within New Jersey Location within the United States
- Location: 15 North Doughty Avenue; Somerville, New Jersey
- Coordinates: 40°34′14.5″N 74°37′05″W
- Built: 1888
- Architect: Jacques Vanderbeck
- Architectural style: Romanesque Revival
- NRHP reference No.: 02000808
- NJRHP No.: 3690

Significant dates
- Added to NRHP: July 17, 2002
- Designated NJRHP: May 29, 2002

The West End Hose Company Number 3 is a historic two-story brick firehouse located at 15 North Doughty Avenue in the borough of Somerville in Somerset County, New Jersey, United States. The building was added to the National Register of Historic Places on July 17, 2002 for its significance in architecture and social history. The building is currently the Somerville Fire Department Museum operated by the Somerville Exempt Firemen's Association.

== History ==
The firehouse was designed by Somerville architect Jacques Vanderbeck in a Romanesque Revival style and built in 1888. The primary design element is the large arched window on the second level featuring squares of textured glass in several colors. The brick arch over it has a granite keystone with "WEST-END HOSE, 1888". It housed the West End Hose Company until 1970, when the company relocated to a new firehouse. The building then became home to the Somerville Fire Museum.

== See also ==
- National Register of Historic Places listings in Somerset County, New Jersey
- List of museums in New Jersey
- Relief Hose Company No. 2 Engine House
