= Reynolds–Scherman House =

Historic house in New Jersey, United States

- U.S. National Register of Historic Places
- New Jersey Register of Historic Places
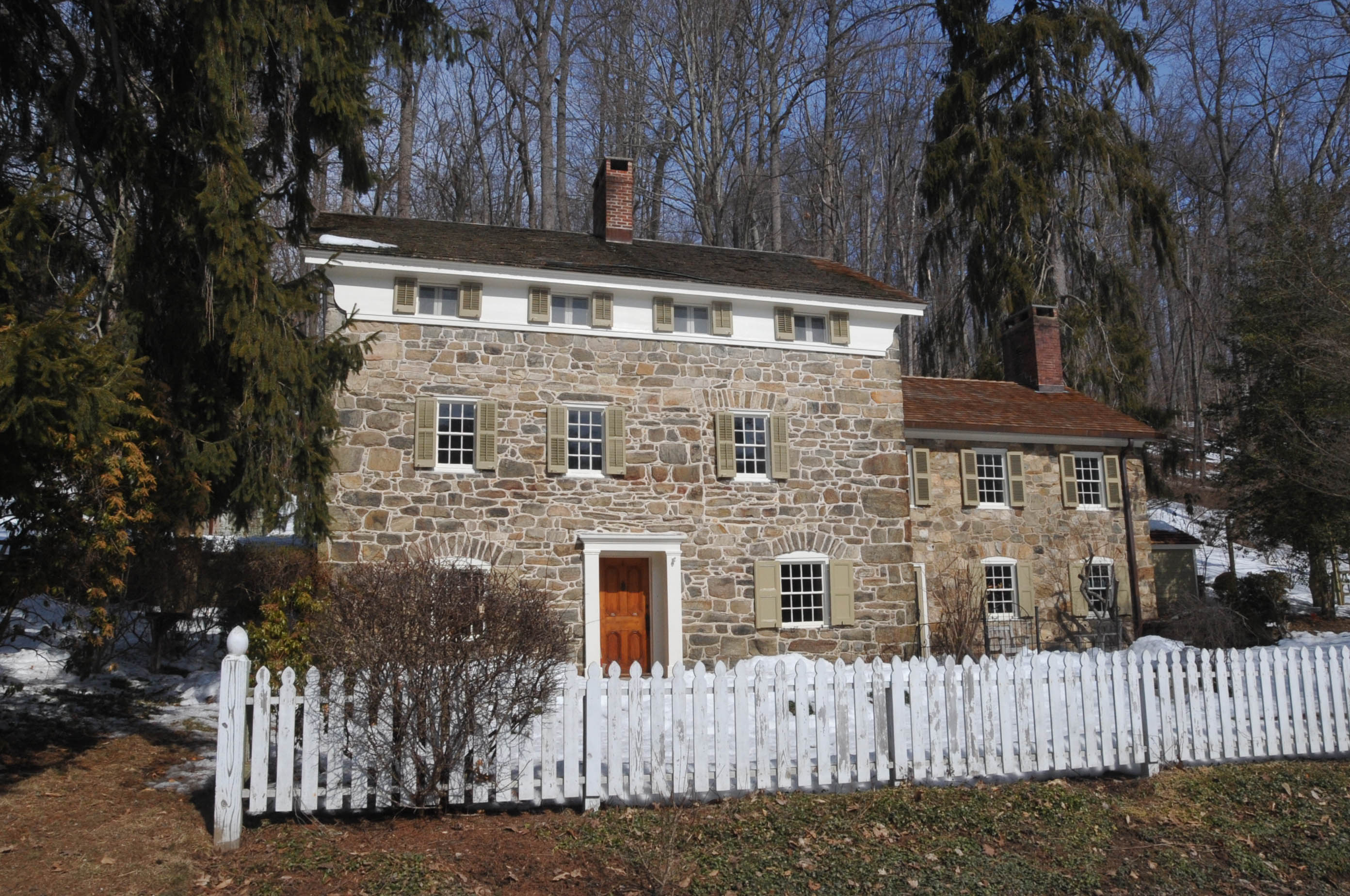

- Location within Somerset County, New Jersey Location within New Jersey Location within the United States
- Location: 71 Hardscrabble Road; Bernardsville, New Jersey
- Coordinates: 40°43′20″N 74°34′21″W
- Area: 12.5 acres (5.1 ha)
- Architectural style: Colonial Revival, Early Republic
- NRHP reference No.: 89000298
- NJRHP No.: 2480

Significant dates
- Added to NRHP: April 29, 1989
- Designated NJRHP: March 3, 1989

The Reynolds–Scherman House is a historic house located at 71 Hardscrable Road in the borough of Bernardsville in Somerset County, New Jersey. It was added to the National Register of Historic Places on April 29, 1989, for its significance in architecture, industry, and literature.

== History and description ==
The two and one-half story stone building was possibly built in the 18th century. During the American Revolutionary War, it may have been used as a storehouse for the nearby New Jersey Brigade encampment in the winter of 1779–80. Samuel Reynolds, local land owner and businessman, converted it into his home after purchasing the property in 1832. The conversion featured "eye-brow" windows. In 1928, it became the country residence of Harry Scherman, a co-founder of the Book of the Month Club, who remodeled it using Colonial Revival style.

== See also ==
- National Register of Historic Places listings in Somerset County, New Jersey
