= Andrew Ten Eyck House =

Historic house in New Jersey, United States

- U.S. National Register of Historic Places
- New Jersey Register of Historic Places
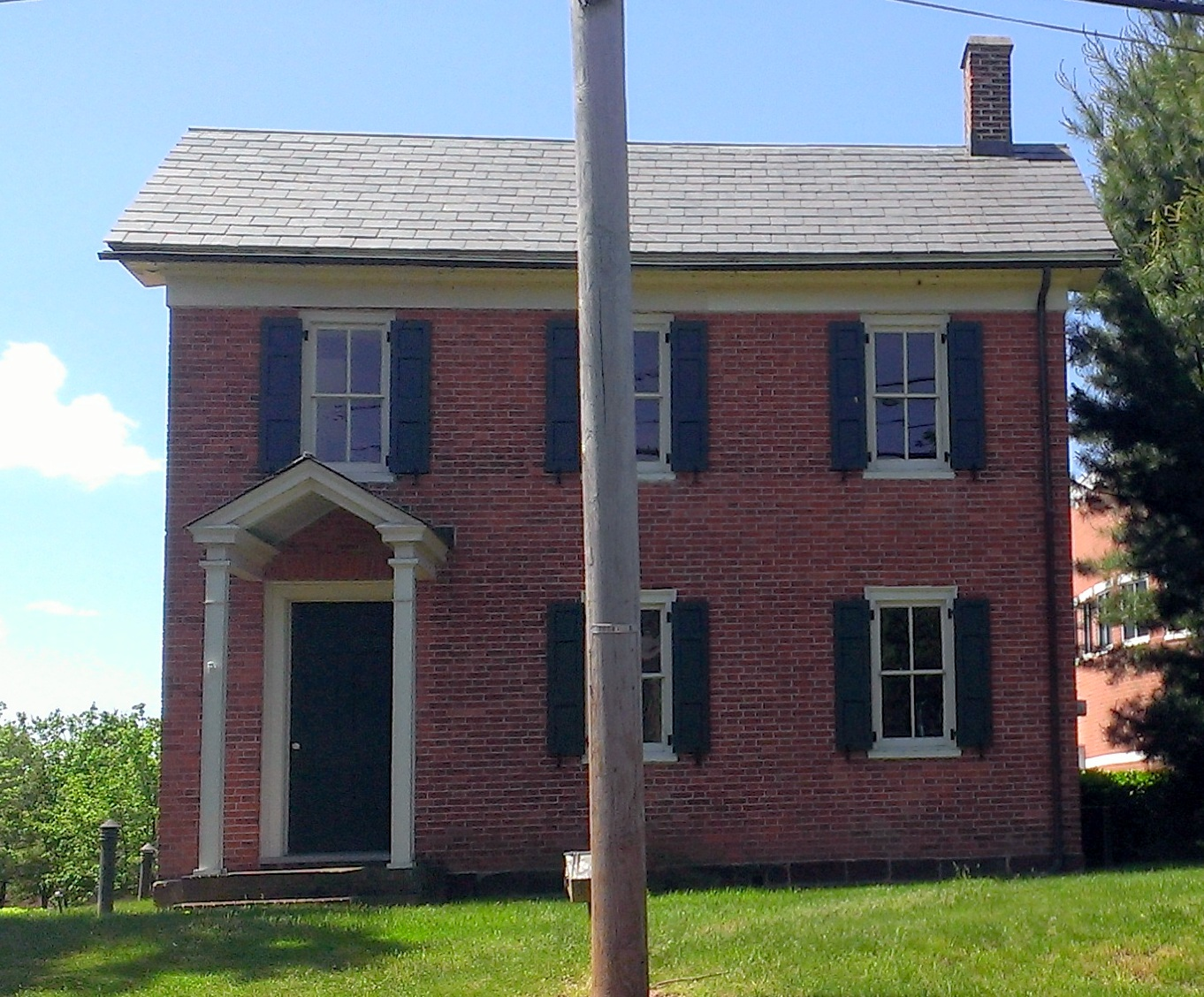
- The Andrew Ten Eyck House, taken from the back

- Location within Somerset County, New Jersey Location within New Jersey Location within the United States
- Location: 671 Old York Road; Branchburg, New Jersey
- Coordinates: 40°33′25″N 74°41′32″W
- Built: c. 1790
- Architectural style: Federal, Colonial Revival
- NRHP reference No.: 04000391
- NJRHP No.: 4198

Significant dates
- Added to NRHP: May 6, 2004
- Designated NJRHP: July 30, 2003

The Andrew Ten Eyck House is a historic farm house located at 671 Old York Road in the township of Branchburg in Somerset County, New Jersey. It was added to the National Register of Historic Places on May 6, 2004, for its significance in architecture.

== History and description ==
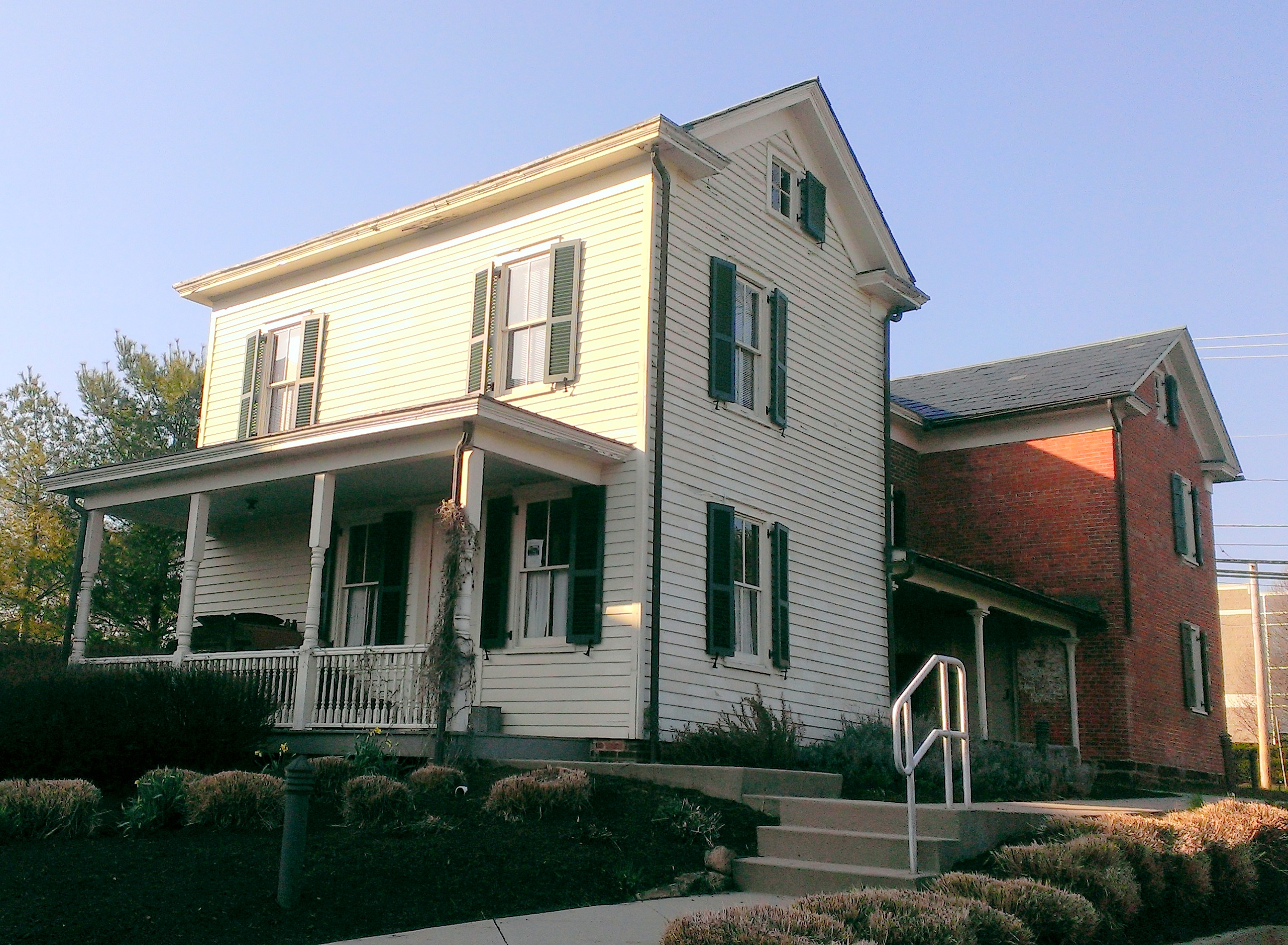
View of frame and brick sections

The house was built around c. 1790 as a single-bedroom home for Andrew A. Ten Eyck (1762–1842) and his wife Mary Ten Eyck, a Dutch couple. It features Federal style and Colonial Revival style. In 1914, it was greatly expanded by adding a frame section to the original brick section.

It was used as a tenant residence for more than 100 years, which is why much of its historic character was kept.

In the early 1990s, the house and the land near it was purchased to create the Murray Corporate Center. When the developer proposed that the house be demolished, members of the community formed the Branchburg Historical Society for the purpose of saving the house.

In recent years, the house has been restored and is set to be a local-history museum. A 2010 article listed the back of the house portion will be used as a meeting space. The second floor contains a local research library.

== See also ==
- National Register of Historic Places listings in Somerset County, New Jersey
