= Huff House and Farmstead =

- U.S. National Register of Historic Places
- New Jersey Register of Historic Places
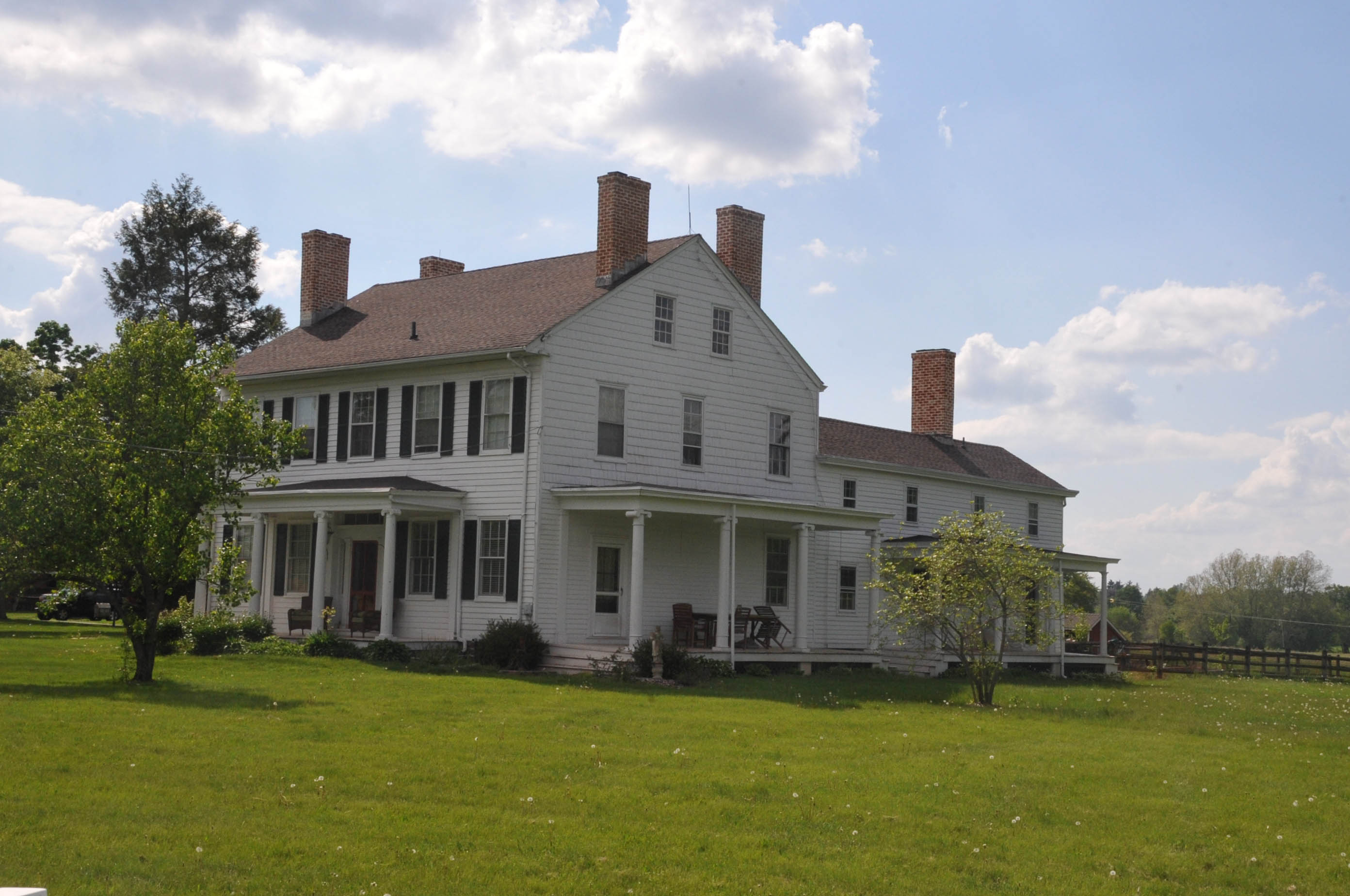
- Huff House

- Location within Somerset County, New Jersey Location within New Jersey Location within the United States
- Location: River Road at the South Branch Raritan River, Hillsborough Township, New Jersey
- Nearest city: Flagtown, New Jersey
- Coordinates: 40°31′02″N 74°43′21″W
- Area: 2 acres (0.81 ha)
- Built: 1842
- Architectural style: Greek Revival
- NRHP reference No.: 76001186
- NJRHP No.: 2519

Significant dates
- Added to NRHP: November 7, 1976
- Designated NJRHP: March 15, 1976

The Huff House and Farmstead is a historic 2-acre (0.81 ha) property located on River Road at the South Branch Raritan River near the Flagtown section of Hillsborough Township in Somerset County, New Jersey, United States. The Huff House was built in 1842 and was added to the National Register of Historic Places on November 7, 1976, for its significance in agriculture and politics/government.

== History and description ==
The building is a two and one-half story farmhouse featuring Greek Revival architecture, in particular the four Ionic columns of the front porch. The house was built by Tunis Huff in 1842. His son, Abraham T. Huff, later owned the house and was a member of the New Jersey General Assembly in 1868. The farm was owned and operated by the Huff family until 1972.

== See also ==
- National Register of Historic Places listings in Somerset County, New Jersey
