= Relief Hose Company No. 2 Engine House =

- U.S. National Register of Historic Places
- New Jersey Register of Historic Places
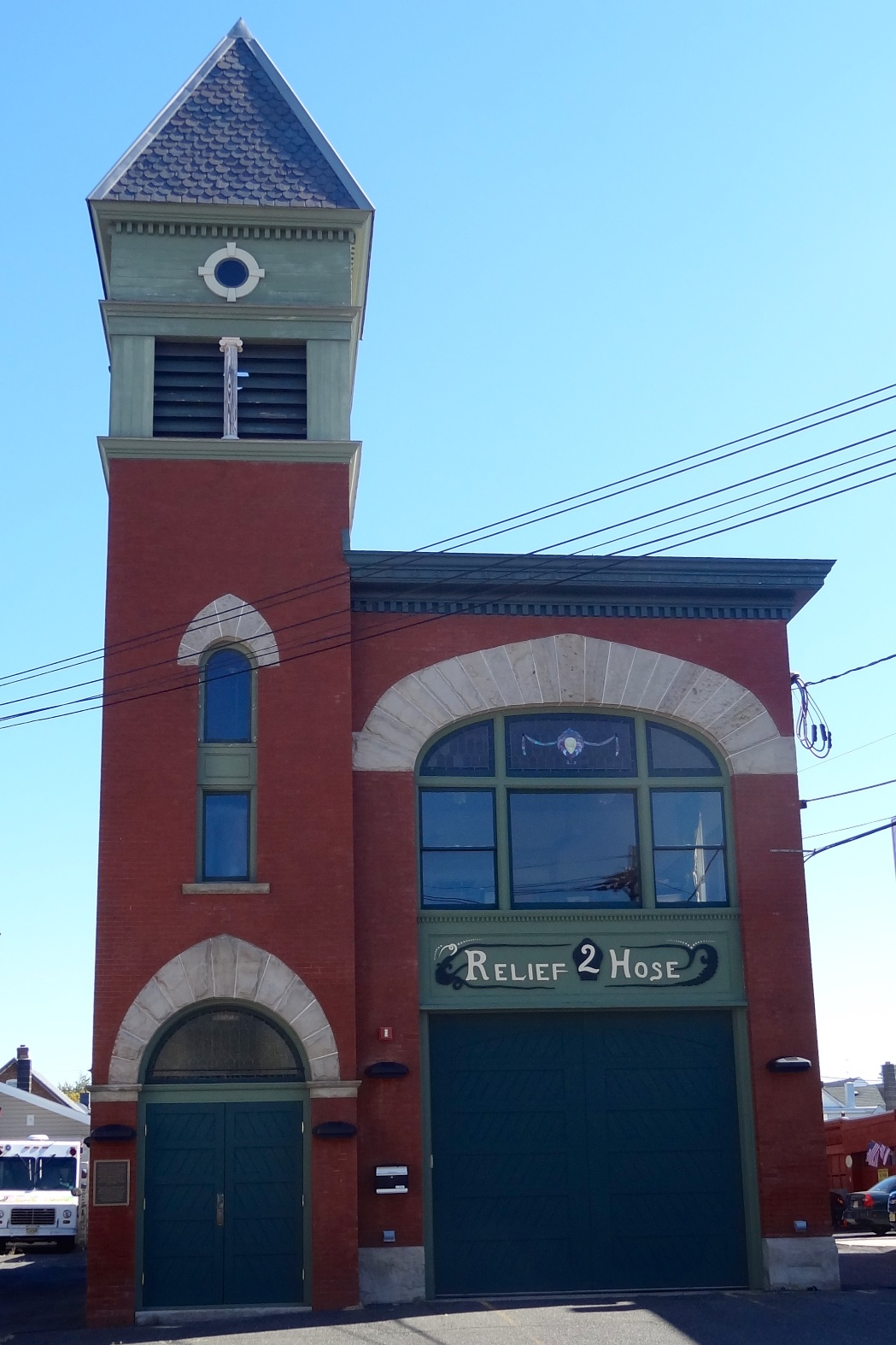

- Location within Somerset County, New Jersey Location within New Jersey Location within the United States
- Location: 16 Anderson Street, Raritan, New Jersey
- Coordinates: 40°34′7″N 74°38′3″W
- Area: 0.2 acres (0.081 ha)
- Built: 1894
- Built by: A.R. Dilts, Hickey & Brady
- Architect: J. Van Derbeck
- Architectural style: Gothic
- NRHP reference No.: 00001466
- NJRHP No.: 3563

Significant dates
- Added to NRHP: December 14, 2000
- Designated NJRHP: October 18, 2000

Relief Hose Company No. 2 Engine House is a two-story brick firehouse with a three-story tower located at 16 Anderson Street in the borough of Raritan in Somerset County, New Jersey, United States. The firehouse was built in 1894 and added to the National Register of Historic Places on December 14, 2000 for its significance in architecture. The building is a well-preserved example of a Victorian-era High Gothic style firehouse. The firehouse has hosted many municipal activities and at times housed Borough Council chambers and the public library. The building is still in use as an active firehouse. It currently houses The Raritan Fire Department's 2007 Seagrave Aerialscope Tower Ladder (52-121).

== History ==
In 1892, the town purchased land to build the firehouse. It was designed by the architect J. Van Derbeck, built by A.R. Dilts, Hickey & Brady, and completed in 1894. The company

their banner "Where duty calls, there you will find us." in the new building.[3]

== See also ==
- National Register of Historic Places listings in Somerset County, New Jersey
- West End Hose Company Number 3
