= Vermeule Mansion =

- Van Deventer–Brunson House
- U.S. National Register of Historic Places
- New Jersey Register of Historic Places
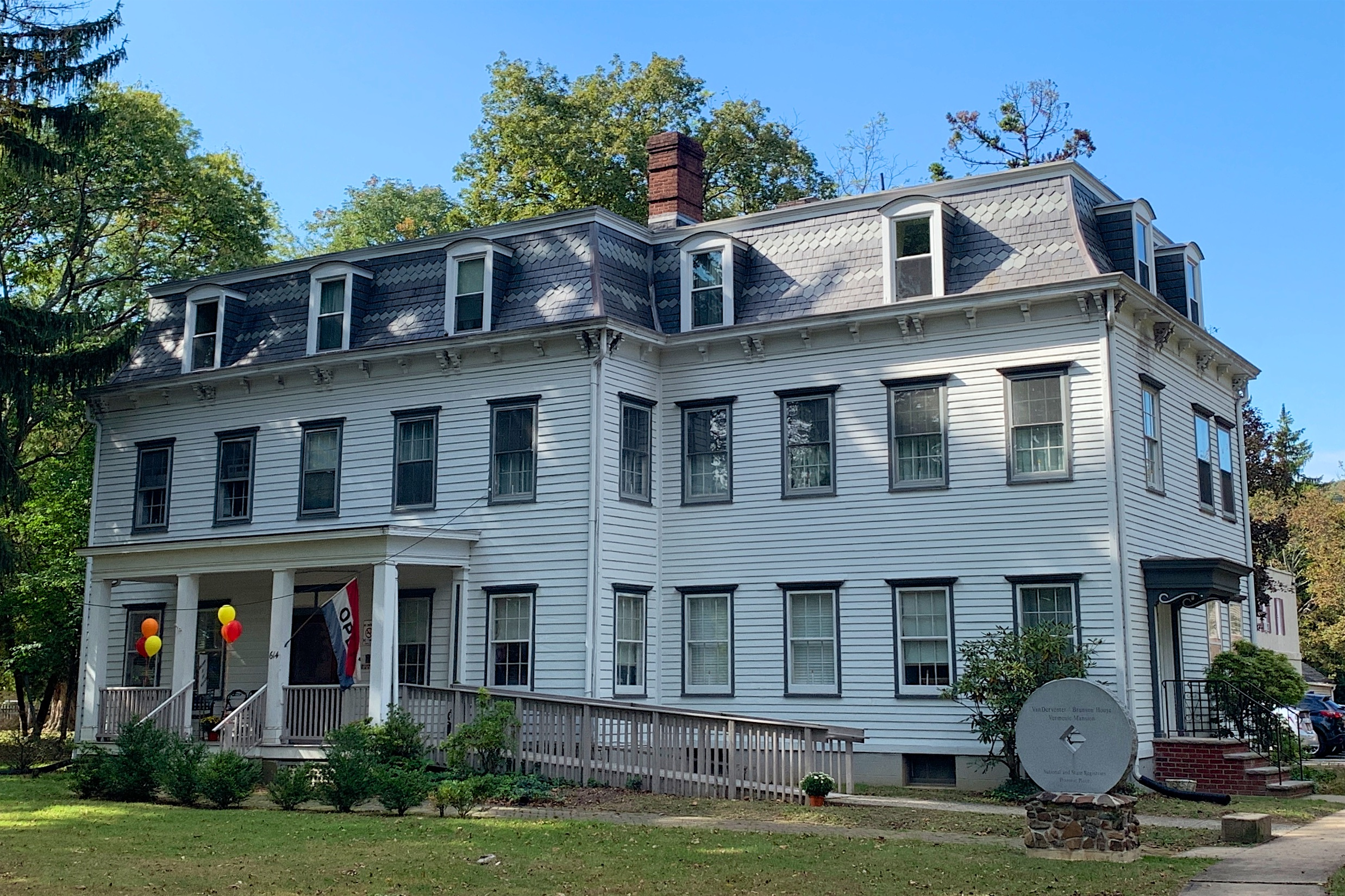
- Vermeule Mansion in 2019

- Location within Somerset County, New Jersey Location within New Jersey Location within the United States
- Location: 614 Greenbrook Road; North Plainfield, New Jersey
- Coordinates: 40°36′34″N 74°27′22″W
- Area: 5.3 acres (2.1 ha)
- Architectural style: Second Empire, Colonial Revival
- NRHP reference No.: 04001191
- NJRHP No.: 4249

Significant dates
- Added to NRHP: October 27, 2004
- Designated NJRHP: March 8, 2004

The Vermeule Mansion, also known as the Van Deventer–Brunson House, is a historic house located at 614 Greenbrook Road in North Plainfield in Somerset County, New Jersey. The building was added to the National Register of Historic Places on October 27, 2004, for its significance in architecture from 1870 to 1911.

== History ==
In 1835, John Vermeule sold the farm property at this site to Jeremiah R. Van Deventer (1809–1889). This house was probably started c. 1840, with a second building phase c. 1870. Van Deventer's grandson, Augustus J. Brunson (1870–1963), inherited the property and made further renovations c. 1911. The house shows both Second Empire and Colonial Revival architectural styles. It now serves as the Vermeule Community Center for North Plainfield.

Since 1985, the house has been used by The Fleetwood Museum of Art and Photographica to exhibit the camera collection of Benjamin Fleetwood and the oil paintings by his wife, Matilda Fleetwood.

== See also ==
- National Register of Historic Places listings in Somerset County, New Jersey
- List of museums in New Jersey
