= McDonald's–Kline's Mill =

- U.S. National Register of Historic Places
- New Jersey Register of Historic Places
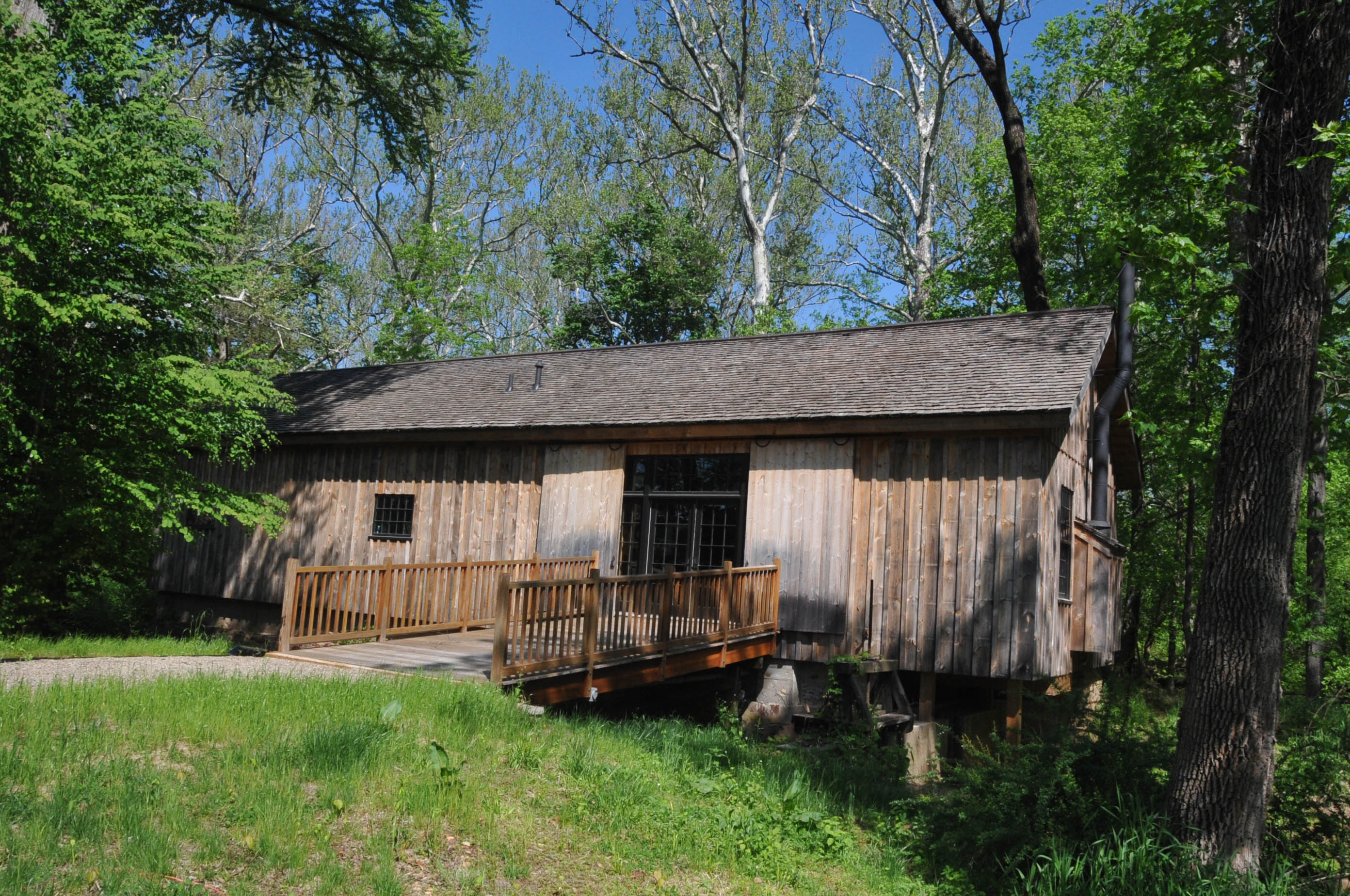

- Location within Somerset County, New Jersey Location within New Jersey Location within the United States
- Location: Kline's Mill Road, Bedminster, New Jersey
- NRHP reference No.: 87000410
- NJRHP No.: 2464

Significant dates
- Added to NRHP: March 9, 1987
- Designated NJRHP: November 20, 1986

McDonald's–Kline's Mill is located on Kline's Mill Road in the township of Bedminster in Somerset County, New Jersey, United States. Located along the banks of the North Branch Raritan River, the former mill was added to the National Register of Historic Places on March 9, 1987, for its significance in engineering and industry.

== See also ==
- National Register of Historic Places listings in Somerset County, New Jersey
