= Dr. John Vermeule House =

Historic house in New Jersey, United States

- U.S. National Register of Historic Places
- New Jersey Register of Historic Places
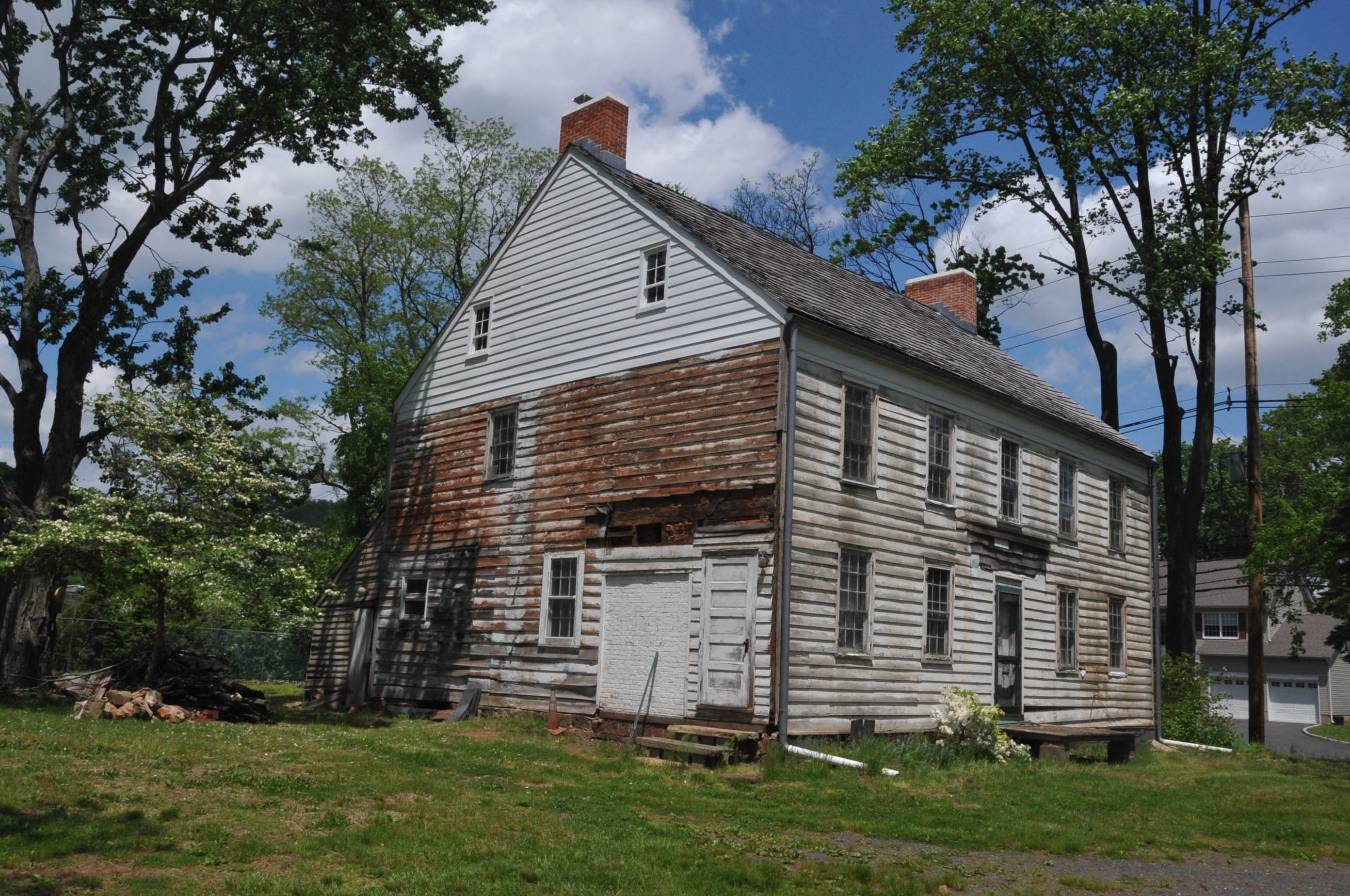

- Location within Somerset County, New Jersey Location within New Jersey Location within the United States
- Location: 223 Rock Avenue; Green Brook Township, New Jersey
- Coordinates: 40°36′27″N 74°27′45″W
- Area: 2.2 acres (0.89 ha)
- Built: c. 1800
- Architectural style: Federal
- NRHP reference No.: 13000024
- NJRHP No.: 4879

Significant dates
- Added to NRHP: February 20, 2013
- Designated NJRHP: October 18, 2010

The Dr. John Vermeule House, also known as the Vermeule–Mundy House, is a historic building located at 223 Rock Avenue in Green Brook Township of Somerset County, New Jersey. It was added to the National Register of Historic Places on February 20, 2013, for its significance in architecture.

== History and description ==
The vernacular frame Federal style house was built c. 1800 by Dr. John Vermeule (1768–1813), who had inherited the property from his grandfather, Cornelius Vermeule (1716–1784), a member of the Second Continental Congress in 1775. His father, Adrian Vermeule (1741–1777), was captured in January 1777 during the American Revolutionary War and died a prisoner of war in the sugar house prisons in New York City. Some timbers used to build the house have been dated to 1787 using dendrochronology. His son, John M. Vermeule (1801-1833), later inherited the property, but had to sell it in 1824 to James Vail (1773–1850). In 1855, it was purchased by Morris Cohen, who sold it in 1868 to land investors, Michael F. Marcley and Martin M. Thorn. A farmer, Abram Pool Voorhies (1845–19l2), was living here by 1900. Green Brook Township purchased the property from Gilbert I. Mundy in 2008.

== See also ==
- National Register of Historic Places listings in Somerset County, New Jersey
