= Jacob Vosseller House =

Historic house in New Jersey, United States

- Vosseller's–Castner's–Allen's Tavern
- U.S. National Register of Historic Places
- New Jersey Register of Historic Places
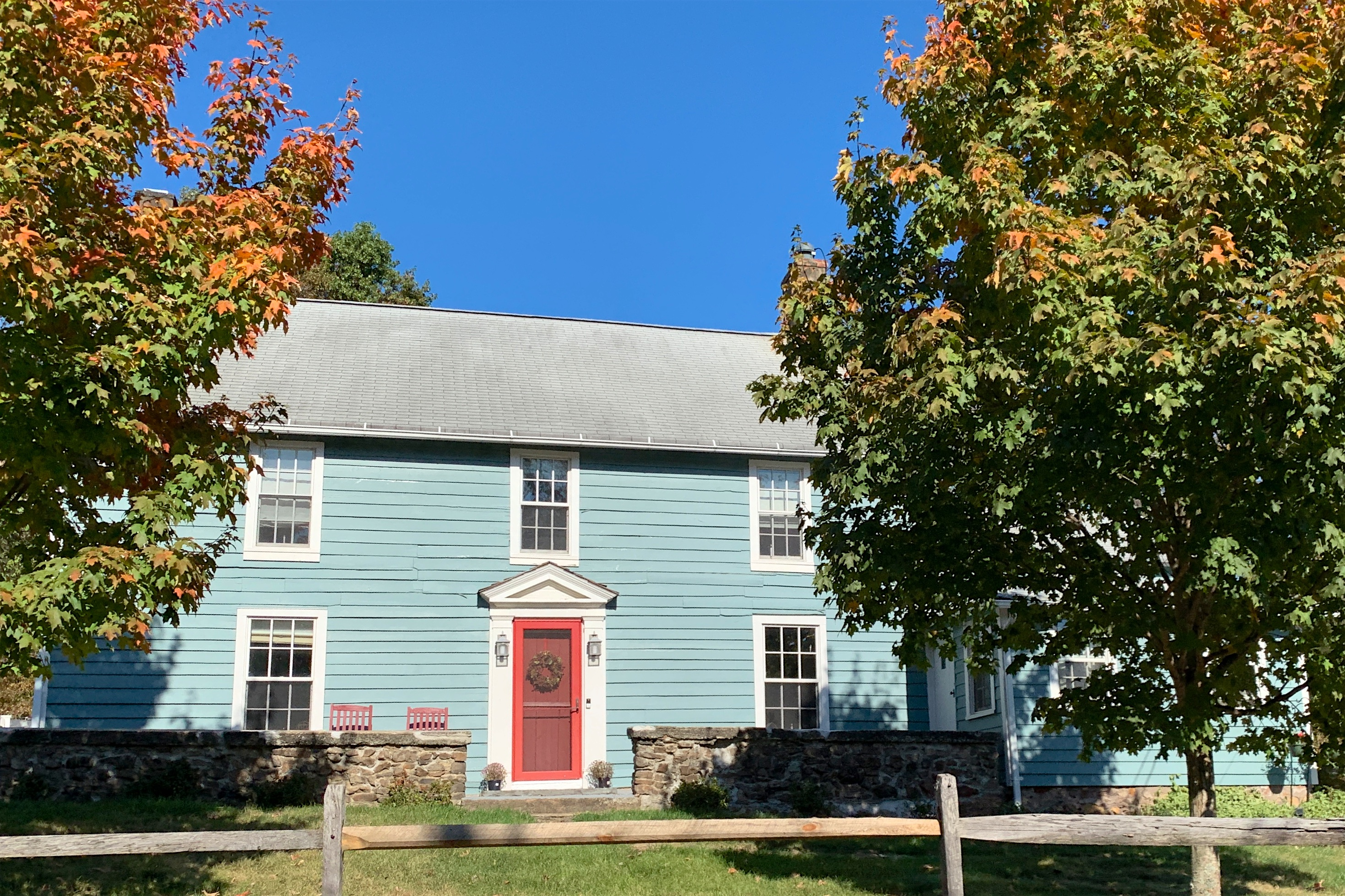
- Jacob Vosseller House in 2019

- Location within Somerset County, New Jersey Location within New Jersey Location within the United States
- Location: 664 Foothill Road, Bridgewater Township, New Jersey
- Coordinates: 40°36′27″N 74°37′07″W
- Area: 5 acres (2.0 ha)
- Built: c. 1753
- Architectural style: Georgian
- NRHP reference No.: 86000133
- NJRHP No.: 2488

Significant dates
- Added to NRHP: January 23, 1986
- Designated NJRHP: November 26, 1985

The Jacob Vosseller House is a historic building located at 664 Foothill Road in Bridgewater Township, Somerset County, New Jersey. The house was built c. 1753. It was known as Castner's Tavern, and later Allen's Tavern, during the 19th century. Listed as Vosseller's–Castner's–Allen's Tavern, it was added to the National Register of Historic Places on January 23, 1986, for its significance in architecture, commerce, settlement, and transportation.

== History and description ==
The two and one-half story frame house, built by Jacob Vosseller about 1753, features Georgian architecture. In 1805, John J. Castner was granted a license to operate it as a tavern and service stage coach travelers on the old Pluckemin Road. In 1811, John Fisher operated the tavern. Castner later sold the property to John Herder in 1814, who sold it to Daniel and Adriana Groendycke in 1832, who sold it to William L. Allen in 1836. After his death in 1863, John K. Allen farmed the property, no longer a tavern, until his death in 1904.

== See also ==
- National Register of Historic Places listings in Somerset County, New Jersey
