= Maplewood Cemetery =

Maplewood Cemetery may refer to

- Maplewood Cemetery (Durham, North Carolina)
- Maplewood Cemetery (Elkins, West Virginia)
- Maplewood Cemetery, Freehold, New Jersey
- Maplewood Cemetery (Marlborough, Massachusetts)
- Maplewood Cemetery (Pulaski, Tennessee)
