= River Road Historic Rural District =

Historic district in New Jersey, United States

- U.S. National Register of Historic Places
- U.S. Historic district
- New Jersey Register of Historic Places
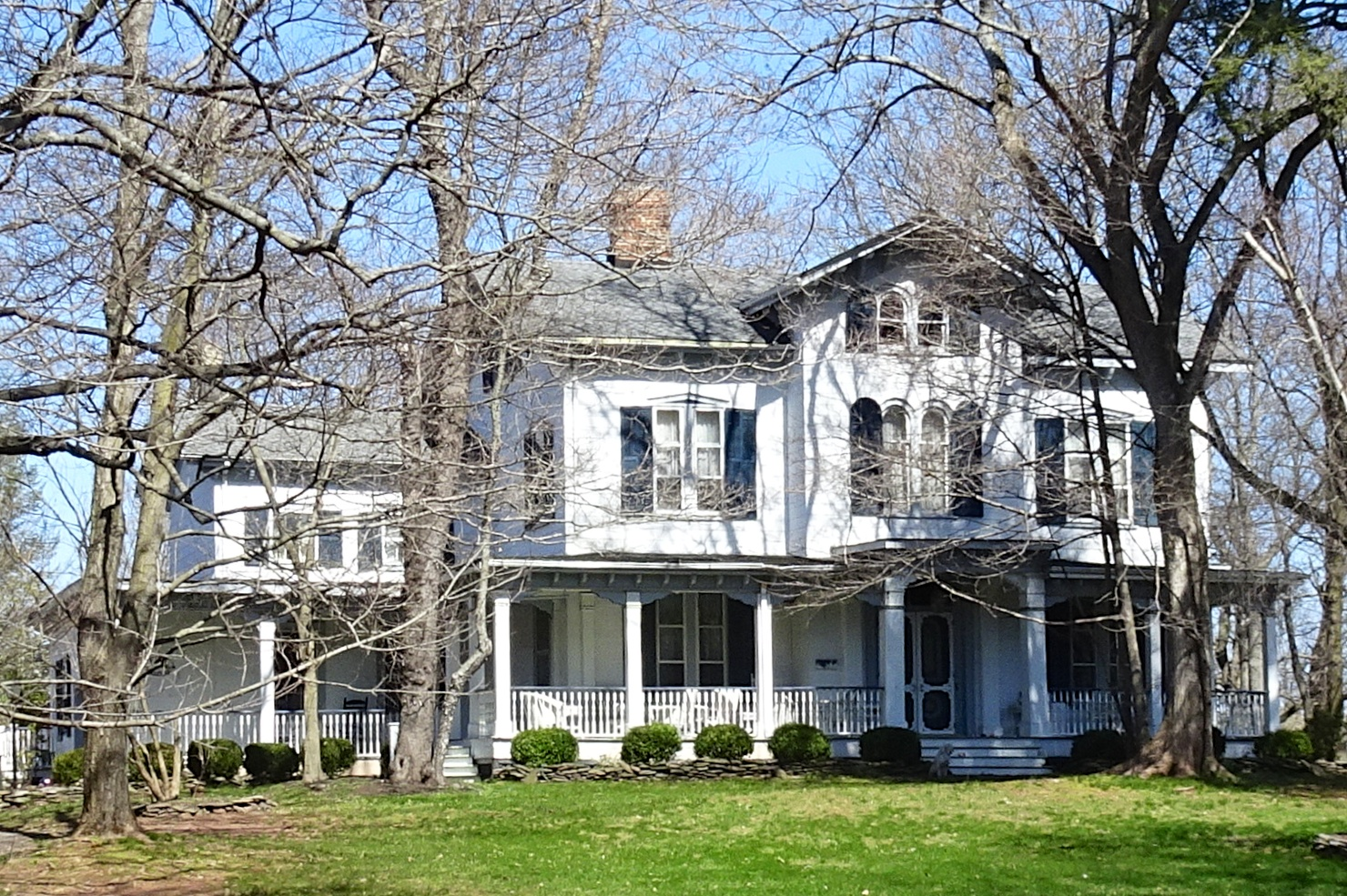
- Laurence Van Derveer House

- Location within Somerset County, New Jersey Location within New Jersey Location within the United States
- Location: River Road / County Route 533 along the Millstone River from Hillsborough Road to Van Horne Road / U.S. Route 206, Hillsborough and Montgomery Townships
- Coordinates: 40°26′16″N 74°37′9″W
- Area: 590 acres (240 ha)
- Built: 1777
- Architectural style: Colonial, Late Victorian, Federal
- NRHP reference No.: 91000256
- NJRHP No.: 2558

Significant dates
- Added to NRHP: March 21, 1991
- Designated NJRHP: January 29, 1991

The River Road Historic Rural District is a historic district located on the western side of the Millstone River along a six-mile segment of River Road / County Route 533 in Hillsborough and Montgomery Townships, Somerset County, New Jersey. It is bounded on the north by Hillsborough Road and on the south by Van Horne Road / U.S. Route 206. The district was added to the National Register of Historic Places on March 21, 1991.

== Contributing properties ==
The Laurence Van Derveer House was built in 1866 in an Italianate style.

The VanDerveer - Campbell House was built 1860–62 in the style of an Anglo-Norman Villa. Many of the farm buildings are also contributing.

The Garret Wyckoff House was built c. 1803 in a Federal style with some Italianate elements.

The Rynear A. Staats House was built in the 1840s with Greek Revival elements.

== Gallery ==
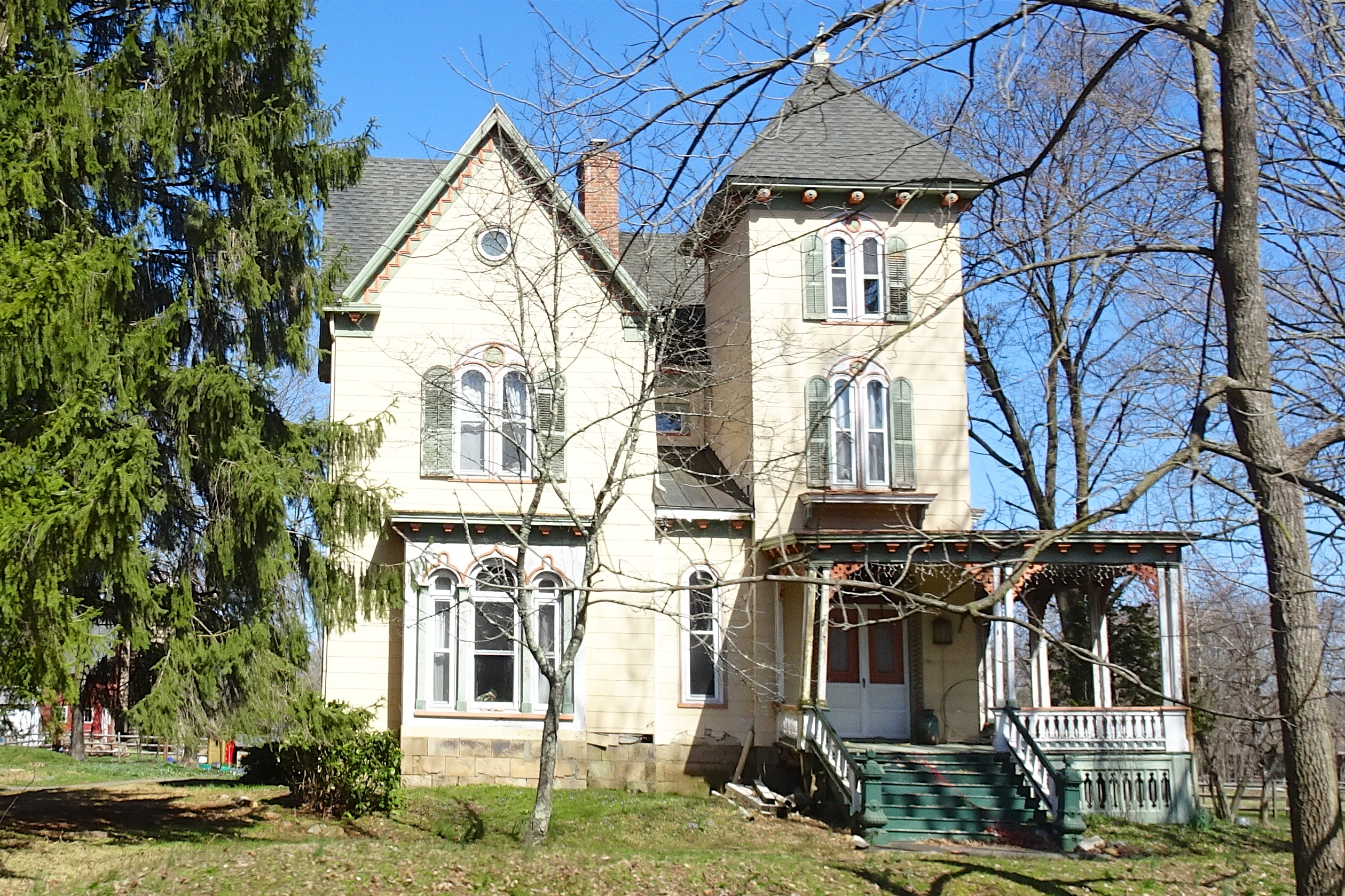
VanDerveer - Campbell House

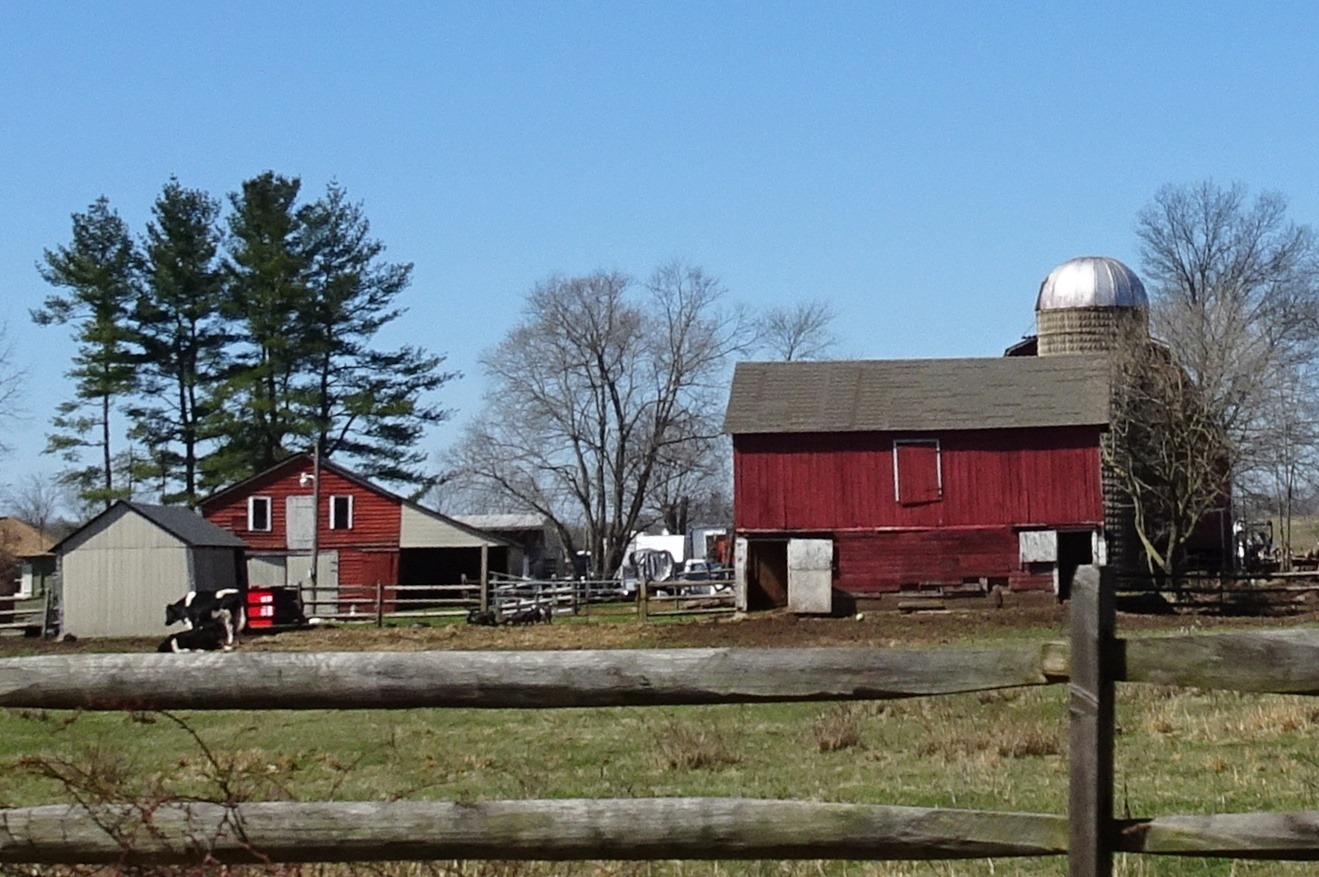
VanDerveer - Campbell farm buildings

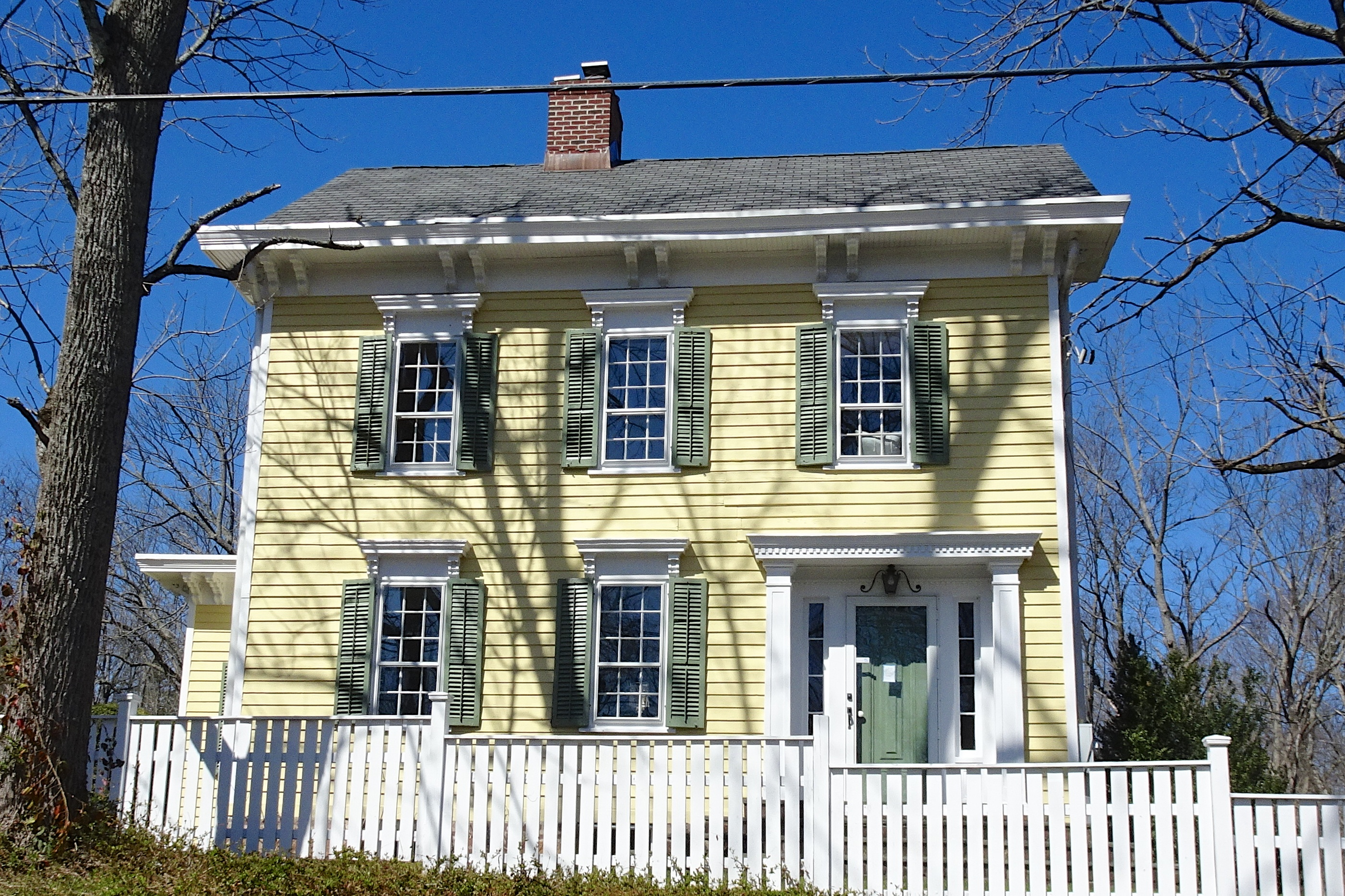
Garret Wyckoff House

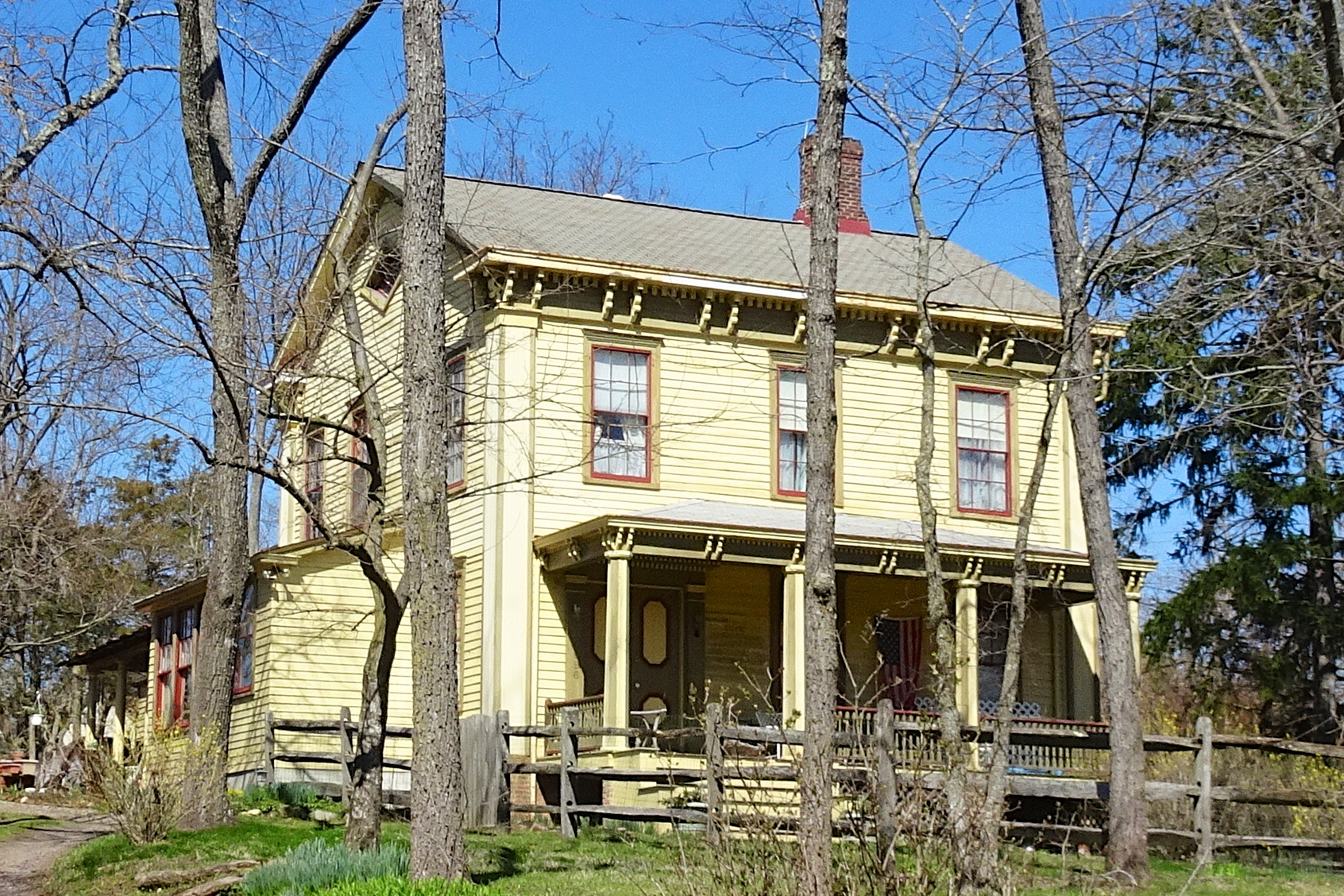
Rynear A. Staats House

== See also ==
- Millstone Valley Agricultural District – adjacent historic district on the north, along River Road
