= Bridgepoint Historic District =

Historic district in New Jersey, United States

- U.S. National Register of Historic Places
- U.S. Historic district
- New Jersey Register of Historic Places
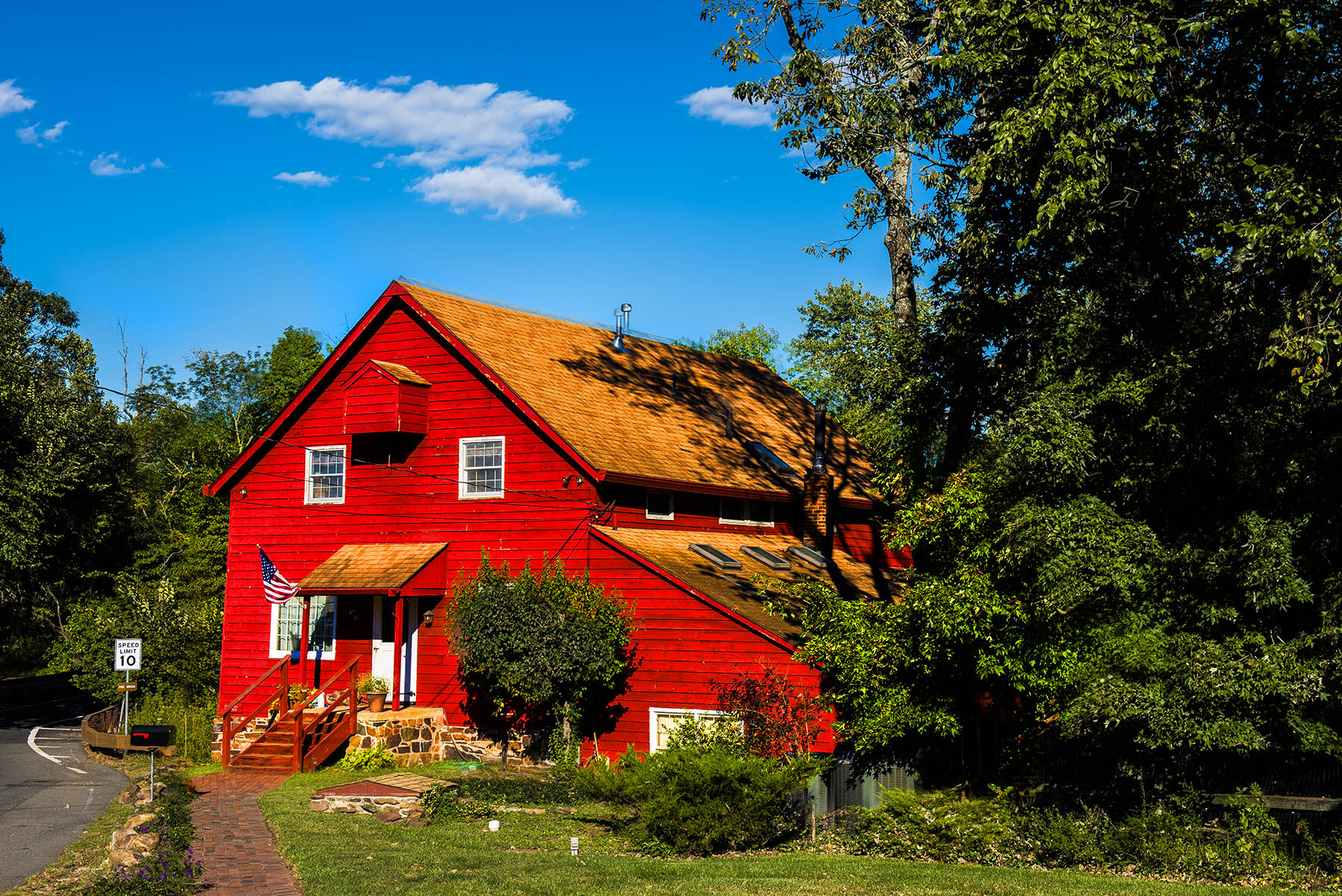
- Former grist mill, converted to a residence

- Location within Somerset County, New Jersey Location within New Jersey Location within the United States
- Location: Along Bridgepoint and Dead Tree Run roads in Montgomery Township, New Jersey
- Coordinates: 40°25′46″N 74°38′55″W
- Area: 225 acres (91 ha)
- Built: 1730
- Architectural style: Late Victorian, Georgian, Dutch/Flemish
- NRHP reference No.: 75001161
- NJRHP No.: 2539

Significant dates
- Added to NRHP: June 10, 1975
- Designated NJRHP: May 8, 1975

The Bridgepoint Historic District is a 225-acre (91 ha) historic district located north of Rocky Hill along Bridgepoint and Dead Tree Run roads in Montgomery Township in Somerset County, New Jersey, United States. The district was added to the National Register of Historic Places on June 10, 1975, for its significance in agriculture and commerce from 1730 to 1850. It includes nine contributing buildings and two contributing structures.

== History and description ==
The oldest part of the miller's cottage was constructed around 1730 and features Dutch/Flemish architecture. The grist mill, located across the street from the miller's cottage, was likely built in the second quarter of the 19th century. The three-arch stone bridge over the Pike Run was built around the 1820s.

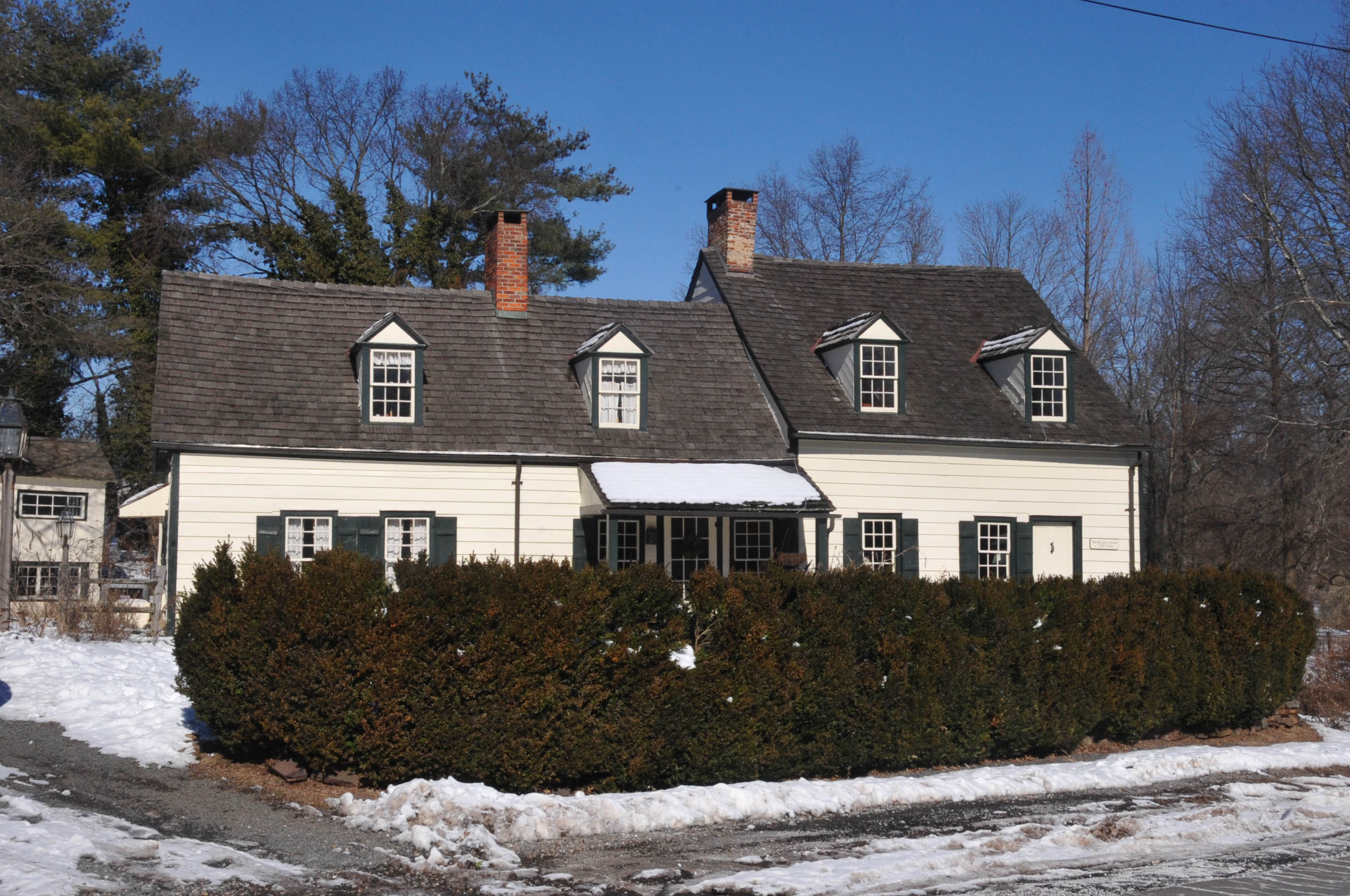
Miller's cottage

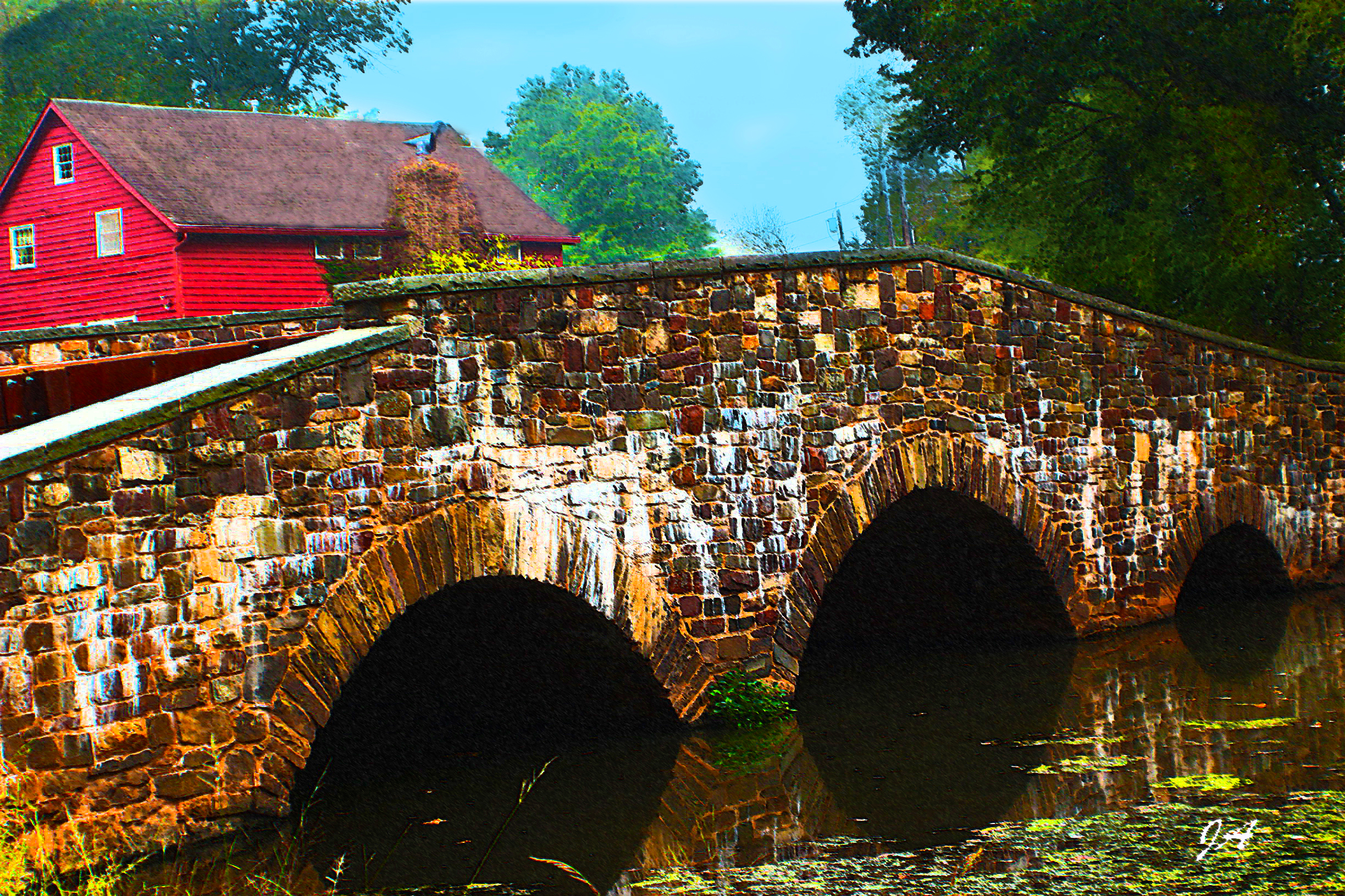
Pike Run Bridge

== See also ==
- National Register of Historic Places listings in Somerset County, New Jersey
