= South Branch, New Jersey =

Populated place in Somerset County, New Jersey, US

- Unincorporated community
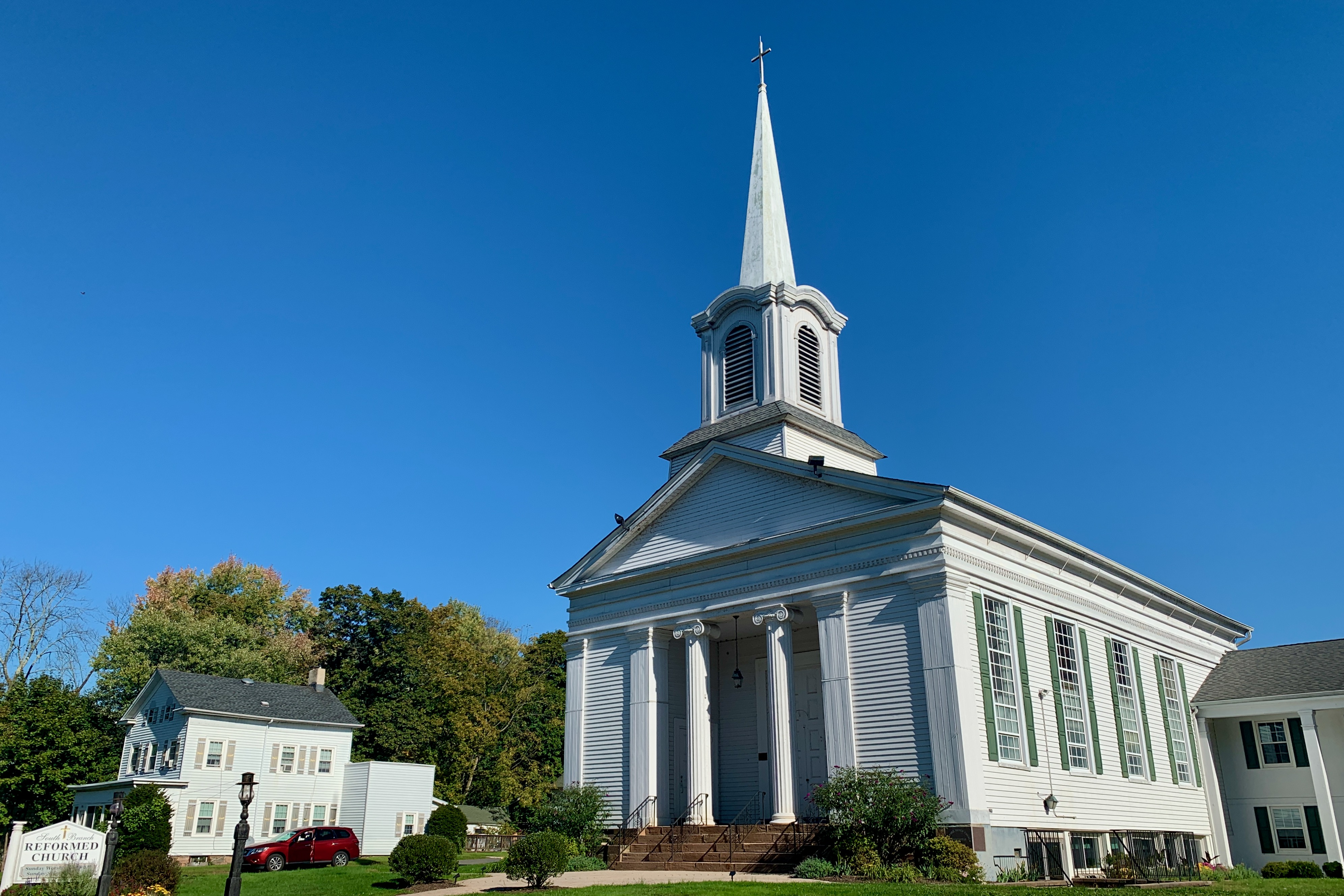
- South Branch Reformed Church

- Location within Somerset County, New Jersey Location within New Jersey Location within the United States
- Coordinates: 40°32′38″N 74°41′49″W
- Country: United States
- State: New Jersey
- County: Somerset
- Township: Hillsborough
- Named for: South Branch Raritan River
- Elevation: 82 ft (25 m)
- Time zone: UTC−05:00 (Eastern (EST))
  - Summer (DST): UTC−04:00 (Eastern (EDT))
- GNIS feature ID: 882406

South Branch is an unincorporated community located within Hillsborough Township in Somerset County, in the U.S. state of New Jersey. The community is named for and is located along the South Branch Raritan River. The South Branch Historic District encompassing the village was listed on the state and national registers of historic places in 1977.

== History ==
The community goes back to 1750 and was also known as Branchville. It is situated on the South Branch Raritan River near its junction with the Raritan River. The Narticong Tribe of the Lenni Lenape Native Americans lived there and called it "Tucca-Ramma Hocking." It was here that the Dutch who made their way up the Raritan to bargain for land made their deal in exchange for beads, guns, blankets, powder and jugs of rum.

Peter Dumont Vroom, the only Governor of New Jersey from Somerset County, was born in South Branch. Diamond Jim Brady once lived in the house known as the South Branch Hotel, which he purchased for his mistress, Edna Maculey in 1903 paying $68,000 for it and altering it to suit his taste, "Going down to Brady's Farm" became the fashionable thing to do and Anna Held, Flo Ziegfeld, Lillian Russell and other famous personalities of the days were frequent guests.

== Historic district ==
- South Branch Historic District
- U.S. National Register of Historic Places
- U.S. Historic district
- New Jersey Register of Historic Places
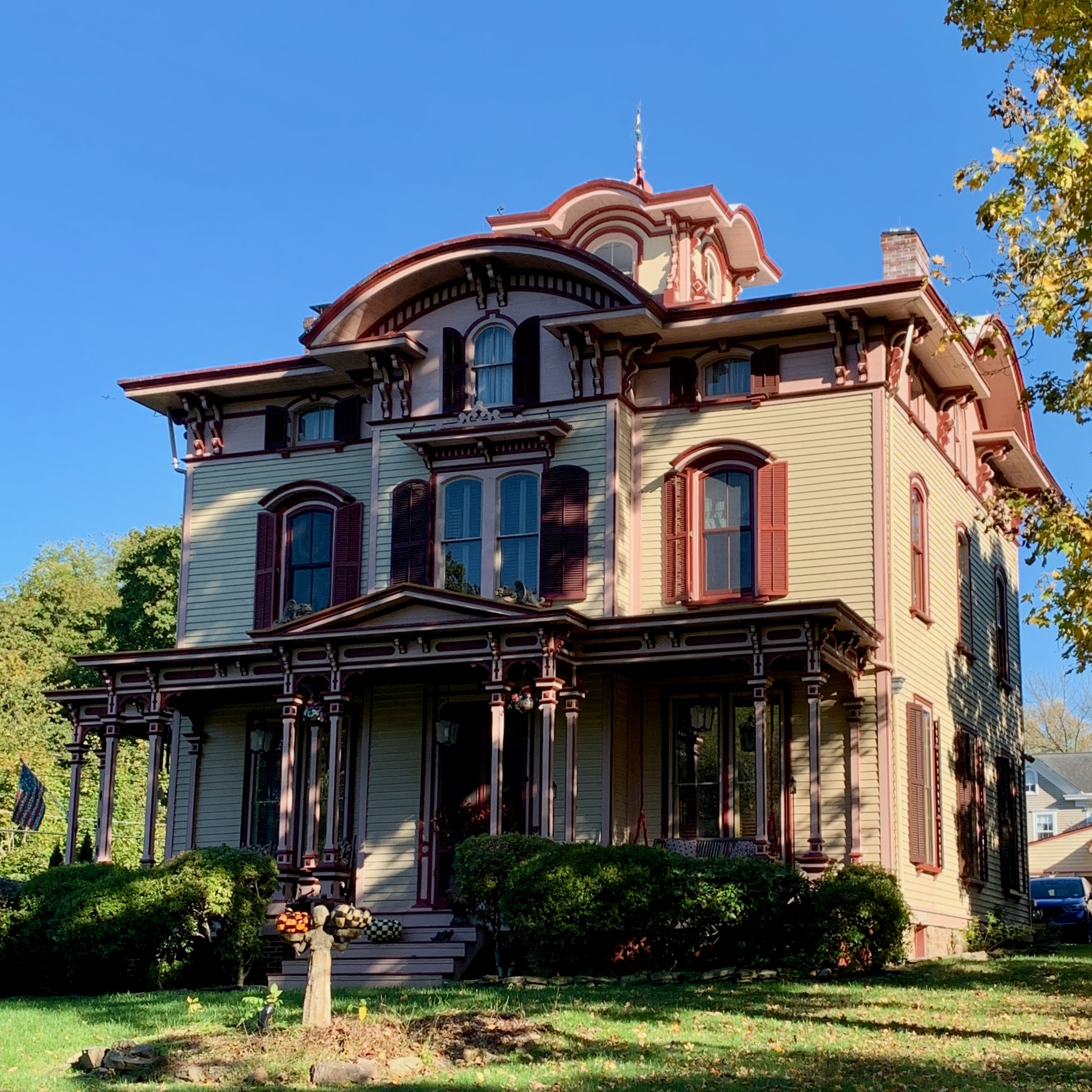
- Italianate style house built c. 1870
- Location: River Road and Orchard Drive
- Area: 30 acres (12 ha)
- Architectural style: Greek Revival, Italianate, Federal
- NRHP reference No.: 77000908
- NJRHP No.: 2527

Significant dates
- Added to NRHP: December 13, 1977
- Designated NJRHP: July 6, 1976

The South Branch Historic District is a historic district along River Road and Orchard Drive in the village. The district was added to the National Register of Historic Places on December 13, 1977 for its significance in architecture, politics / government, and religion. It includes 25 contributing buildings.

== Gallery ==
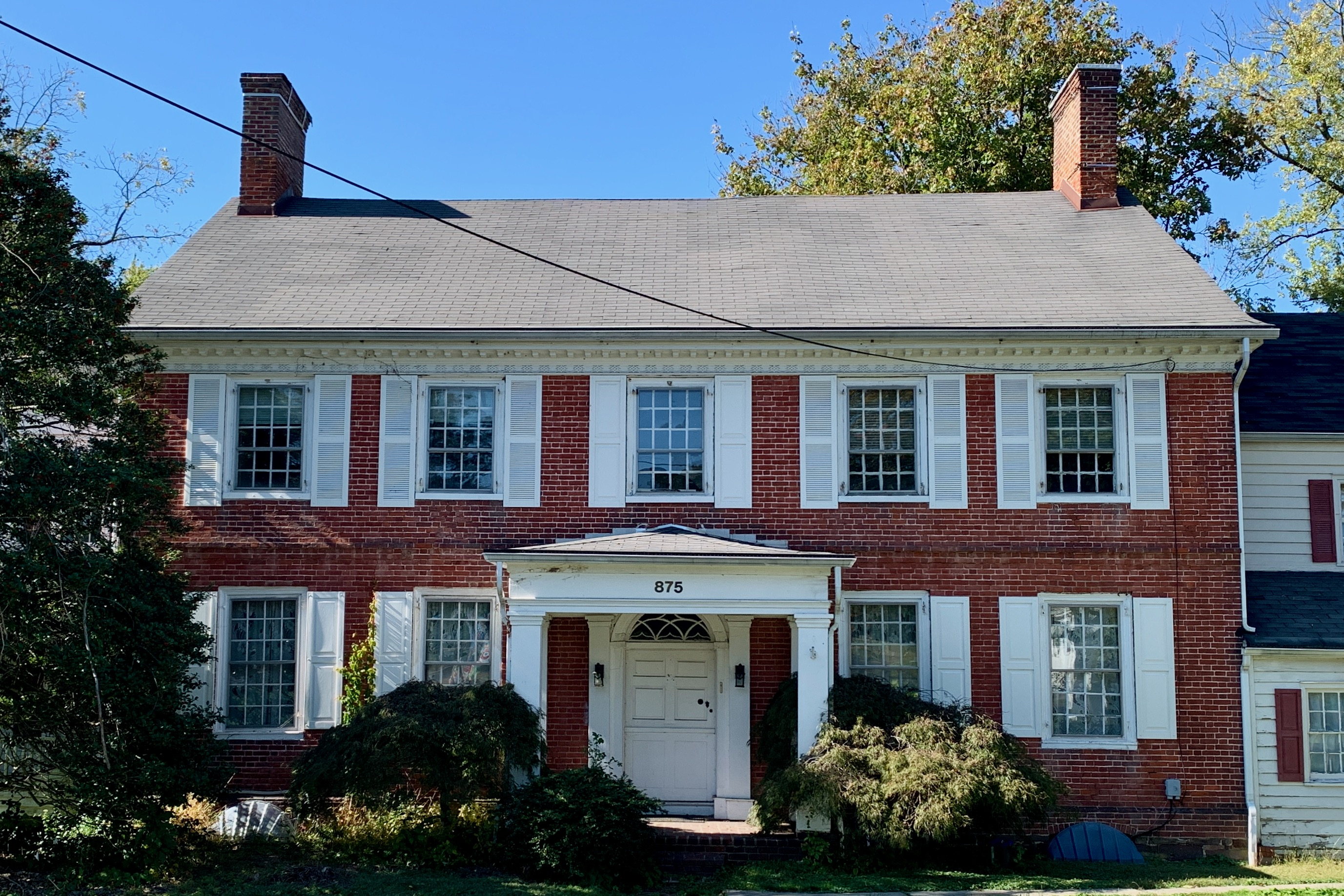
Peter D. Vroom House

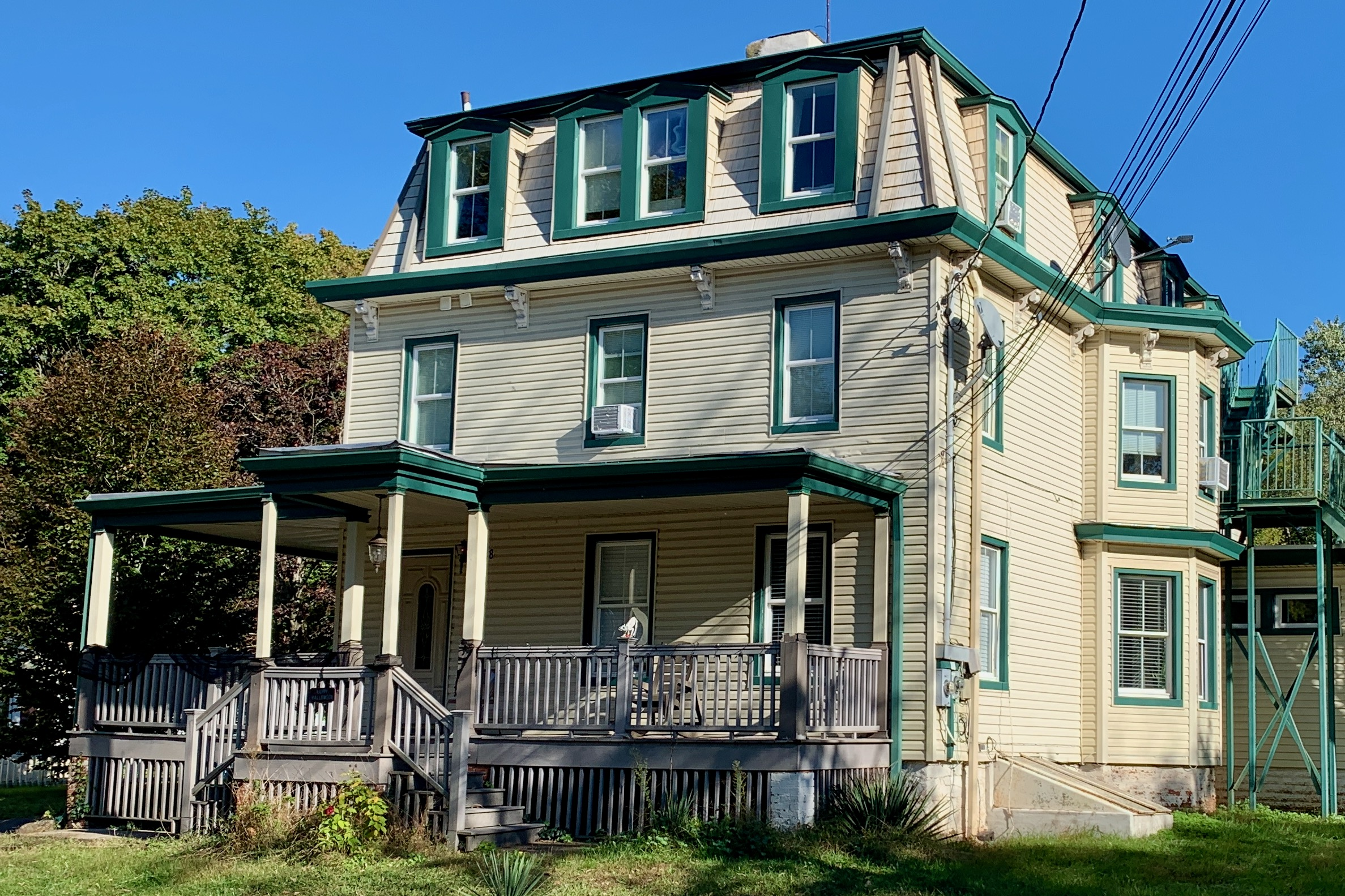
House with mansard roof

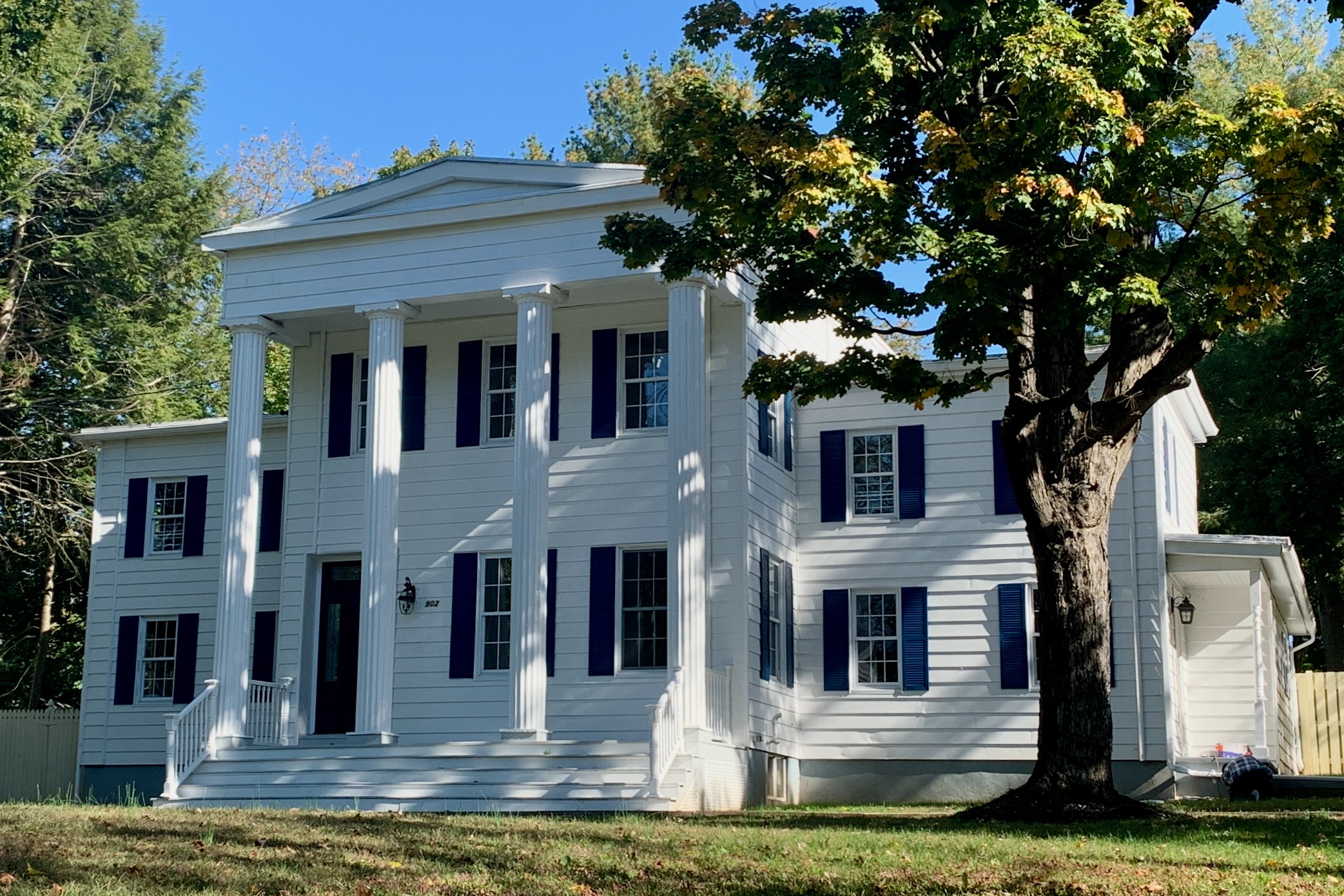
Greek Revival Temple Farm House

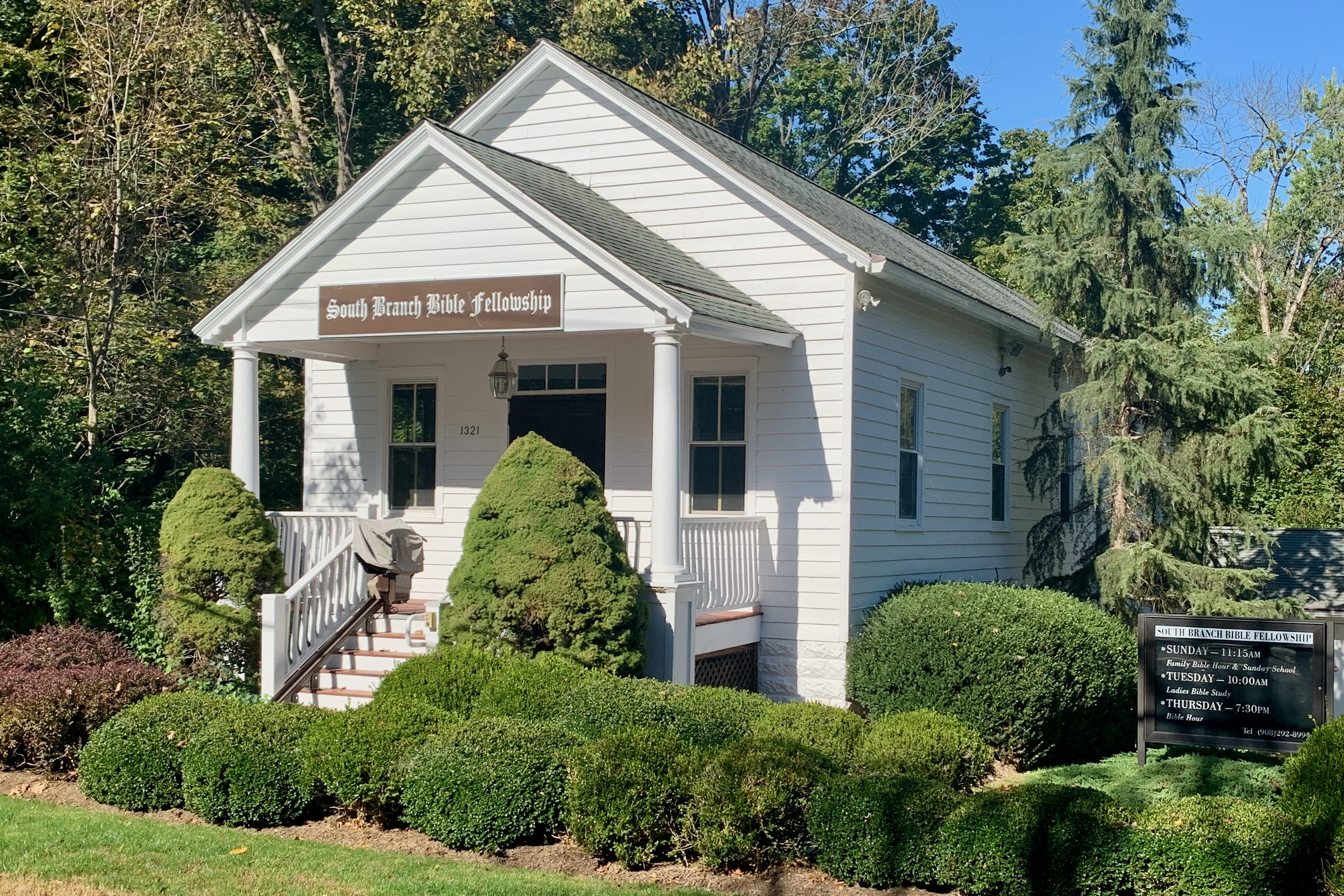
South Branch Bible Fellowship
