= Millstone Valley Agricultural District =

Historic district in New Jersey, United States

- U.S. National Register of Historic Places
- U.S. Historic district
- New Jersey Register of Historic Places
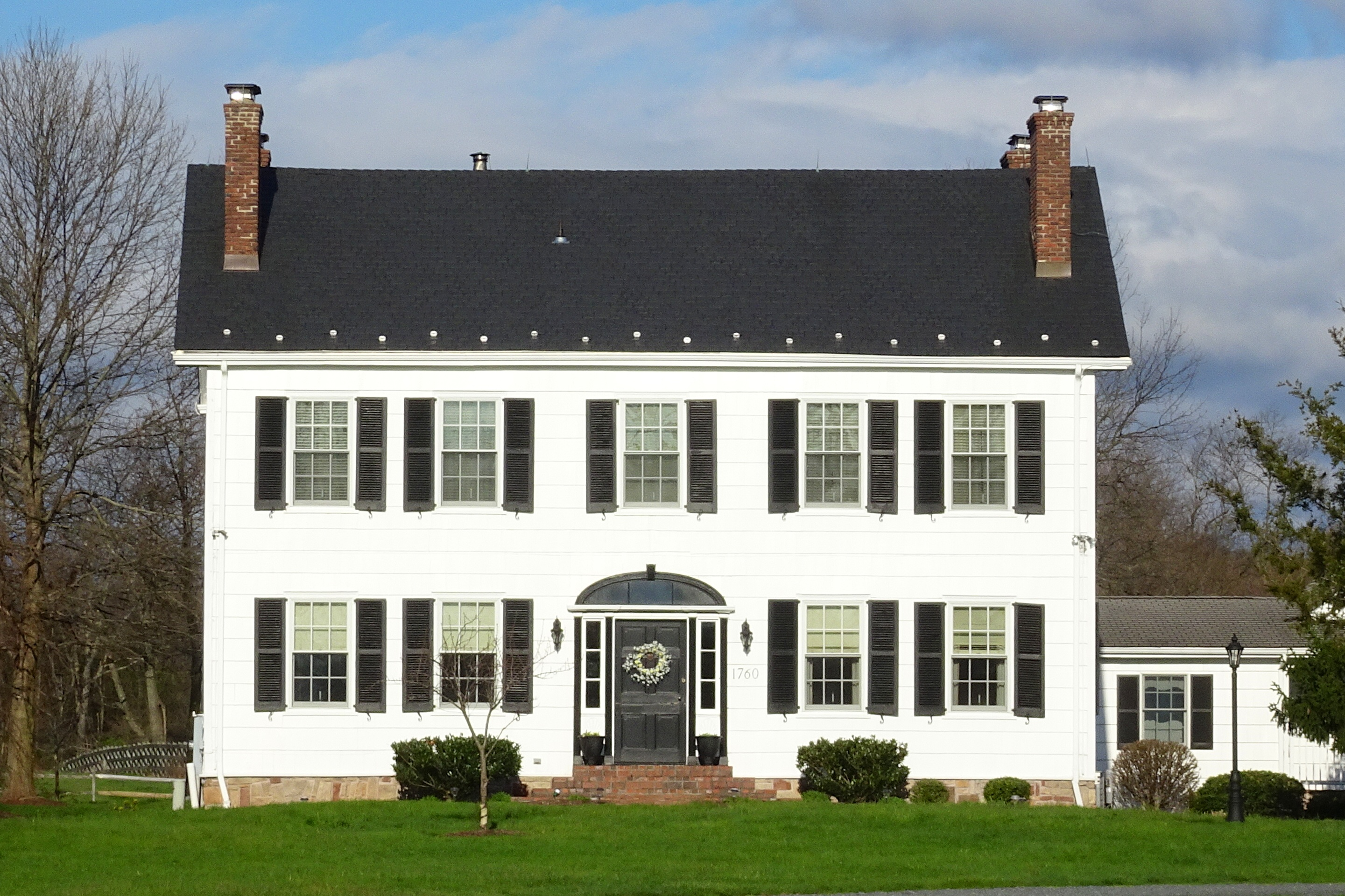
- Blackwell's Mills Farmhouse

- Location within Somerset County, New Jersey Location within New Jersey Location within the United States
- Location: South of Millstone along River Road / County Route 533, Hillsborough Township
- Coordinates: 40°28′52″N 74°34′50″W
- Area: 573 acres (232 ha)
- Built: 1825
- Architectural style: Federal, Greek Revival, Late Victorian, Georgian
- NRHP reference No.: 77000907
- NJRHP No.: 2522

Significant dates
- Added to NRHP: August 10, 1977
- Designated NJRHP: February 7, 1977

The Millstone Valley Agricultural District is a historic district located south of Millstone on the western side of the Millstone River along River Road / County Route 533 in Hillsborough Township, Somerset County, New Jersey. The district was added to the National Register of Historic Places on August 10, 1977.

== Contributing properties ==
The Blackwell's Mills Farmhouse was built in the first quarter of the 19th century. The two and one half story building shows Federal style.

The Brookie was built early to mid 19th century. It shows Greek Revival style.

== Gallery ==
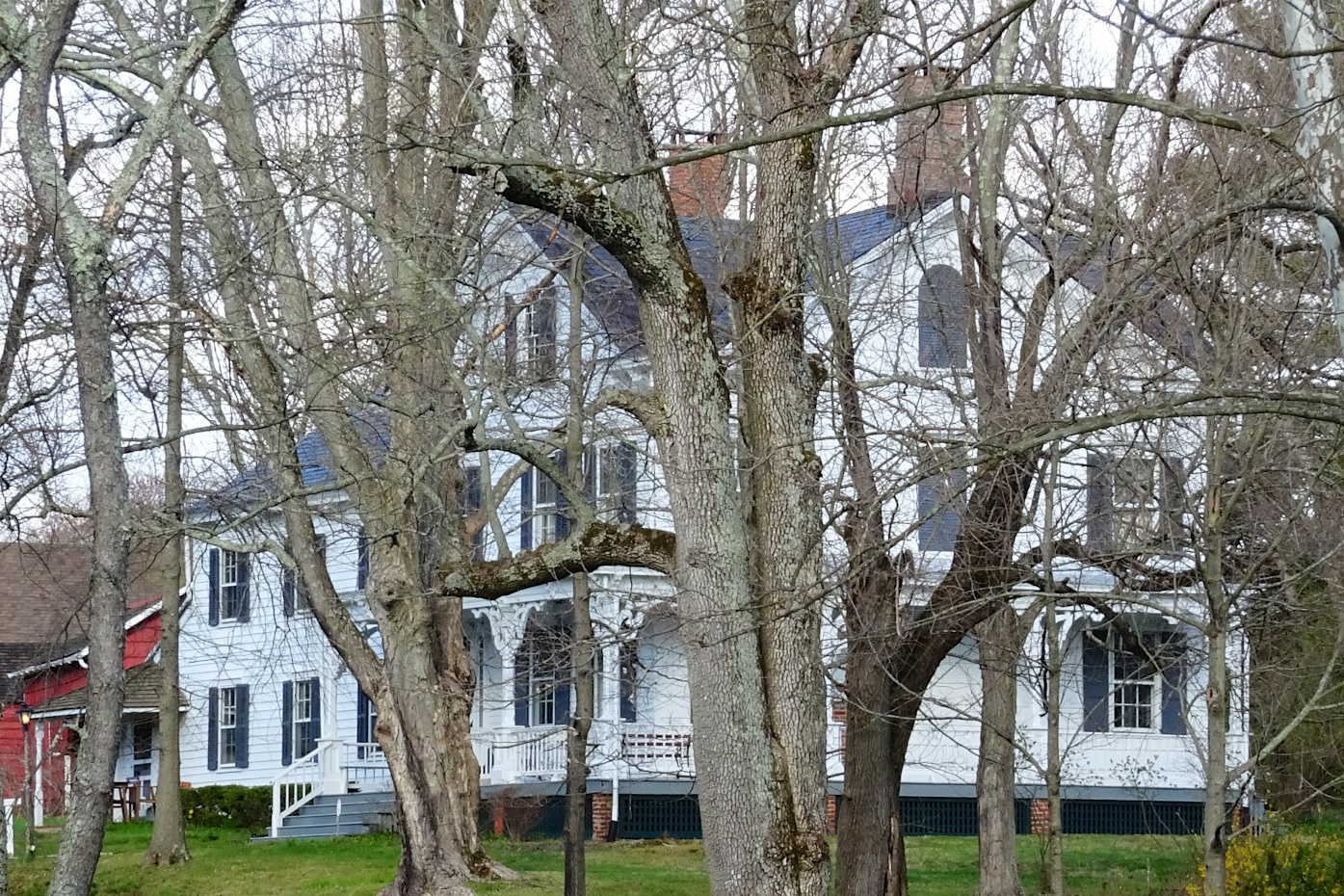
The Brookie

== See also ==
- River Road Historic Rural District – adjacent historic district on the south, along River Road
