= Maplewood, West Virginia =

- Unincorporated community
- Location within West Virginia Location within the United States
- Coordinates: 37°55′35″N 80°55′59″W
- Country: United States
- State: West Virginia
- County: Fayette
- Elevation: 2,720 ft (830 m)
- Time zone: UTC-5 (Eastern (EST))
  - Summer (DST): UTC-4 (EDT)
- Area codes: 304 & 681
- GNIS feature ID: 1542742

Maplewood is an unincorporated community in Fayette County, West Virginia, United States. Maplewood is located on West Virginia Route 41, 6.5 miles (10.5 km) northwest of Meadow Bridge.

The community was named for a sugar maple tree at the original town site.
