= Maplewood (Montgomery Township, New Jersey) =

Historic house in New Jersey, United States

- U.S. National Register of Historic Places
- New Jersey Register of Historic Places
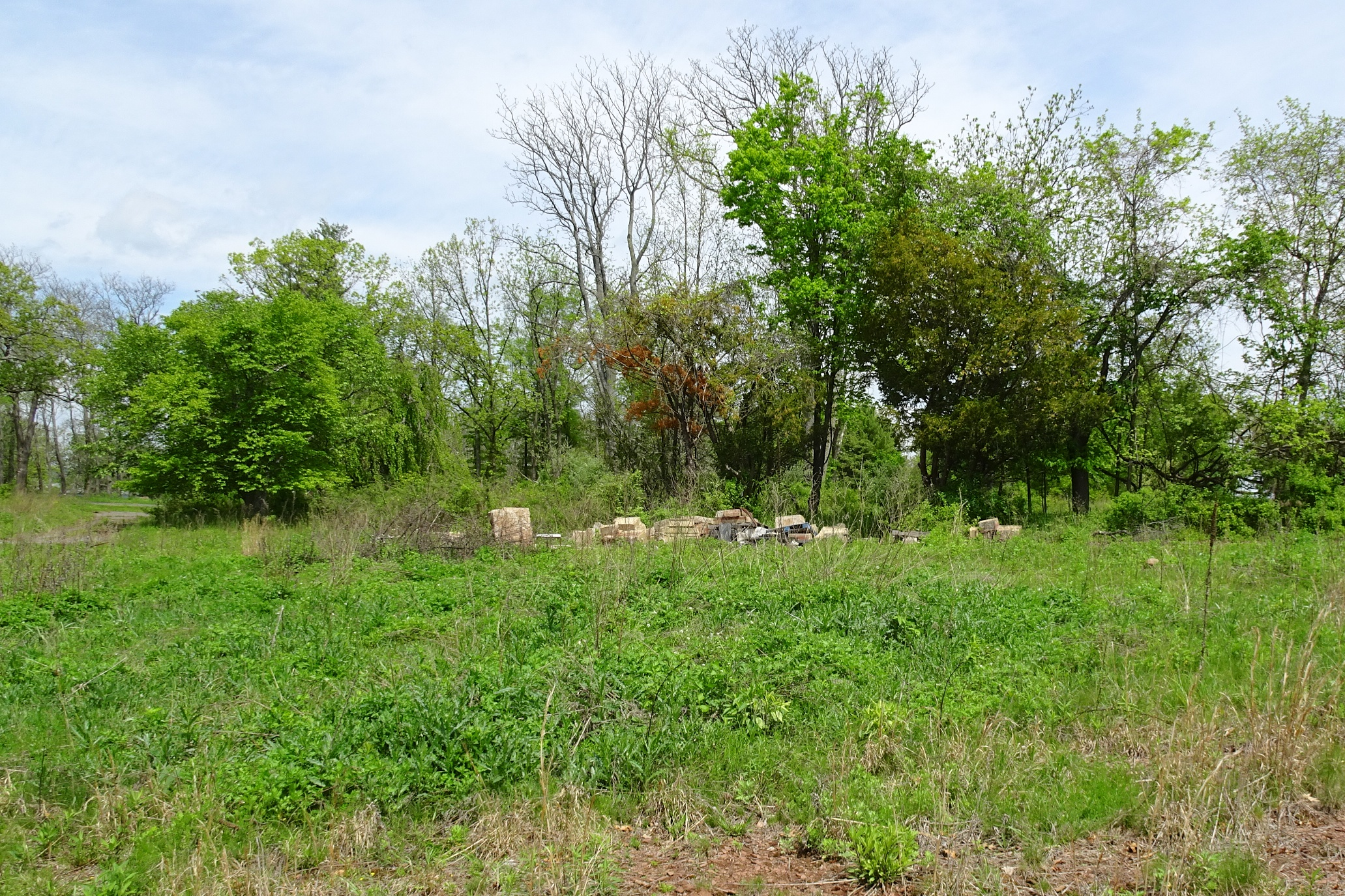
- Site of former Maplewood

- Location within Somerset County, New Jersey Location within New Jersey Location within the United States
- Location: Burnt Hill Road at Rock Brook, Montgomery Township, New Jersey
- Coordinates: 40°24′50″N 74°41′2″W
- Area: 6.9 acres (2.8 ha)
- Built: 1845
- Architectural style: Greek Revival
- NRHP reference No.: 00000960
- NJRHP No.: 376

Significant dates
- Added to NRHP: August 24, 2000
- Designated NJRHP: June 1, 2000

Maplewood, also known as the David C. Voorhees House or the John A. Voorhees House, was a historic building overlooking Burnt Hill Road at Rock Brook in Montgomery Township, Somerset County, New Jersey. It was added to the National Register of Historic Places on August 24, 2000. for its significance in architecture and health/medicine. It was destroyed by fire on November 19, 2011.

== History ==
The house was built in 1845 by John A. Voorhees as a farmhouse. When he died in 1876, it passed to his son David C. Voorhees. At this time the house was known as Maplewood. When he died in 1898, the farm was sold to the State of New Jersey to be used as the New Jersey State Village for Epileptics. Maplewood then became the Superintendent's Residence of the Village.

== Gallery ==
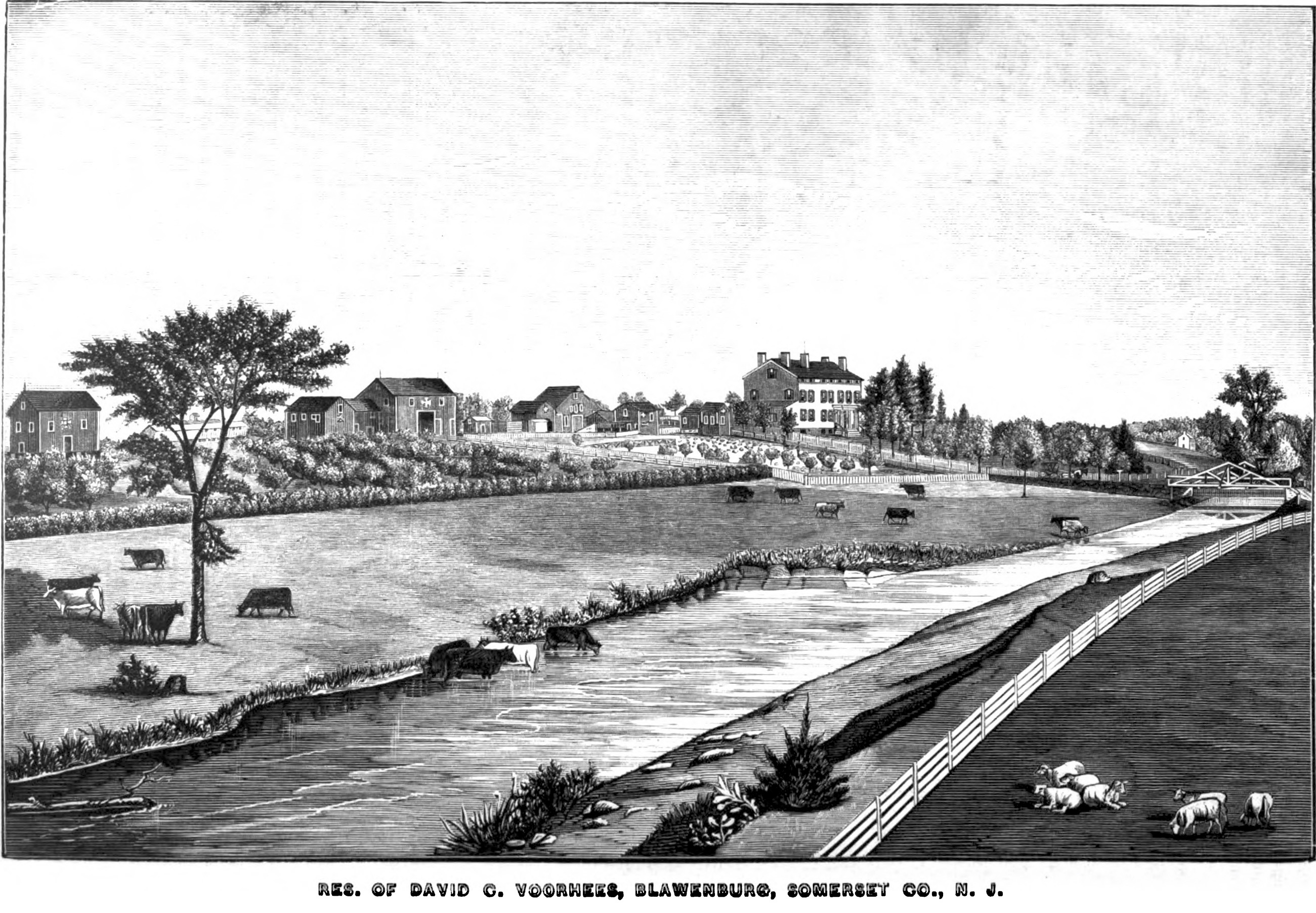
Drawing from 1881 of Maplewood, residence of David C. Voorhees
