= Neshanic =

Neshanic may refer to the following in the U.S. state of New Jersey:

- Neshanic, New Jersey, an unincorporated community within Hillsborough Township, Somerset County
- Neshanic Station, New Jersey, an unincorporated community within Branchburg Township, Somerset County
- Neshanic River, a tributary of the South Branch Raritan River
