= Branchburg, New Jersey =

Township in Somerset County, New Jersey, US

- Township
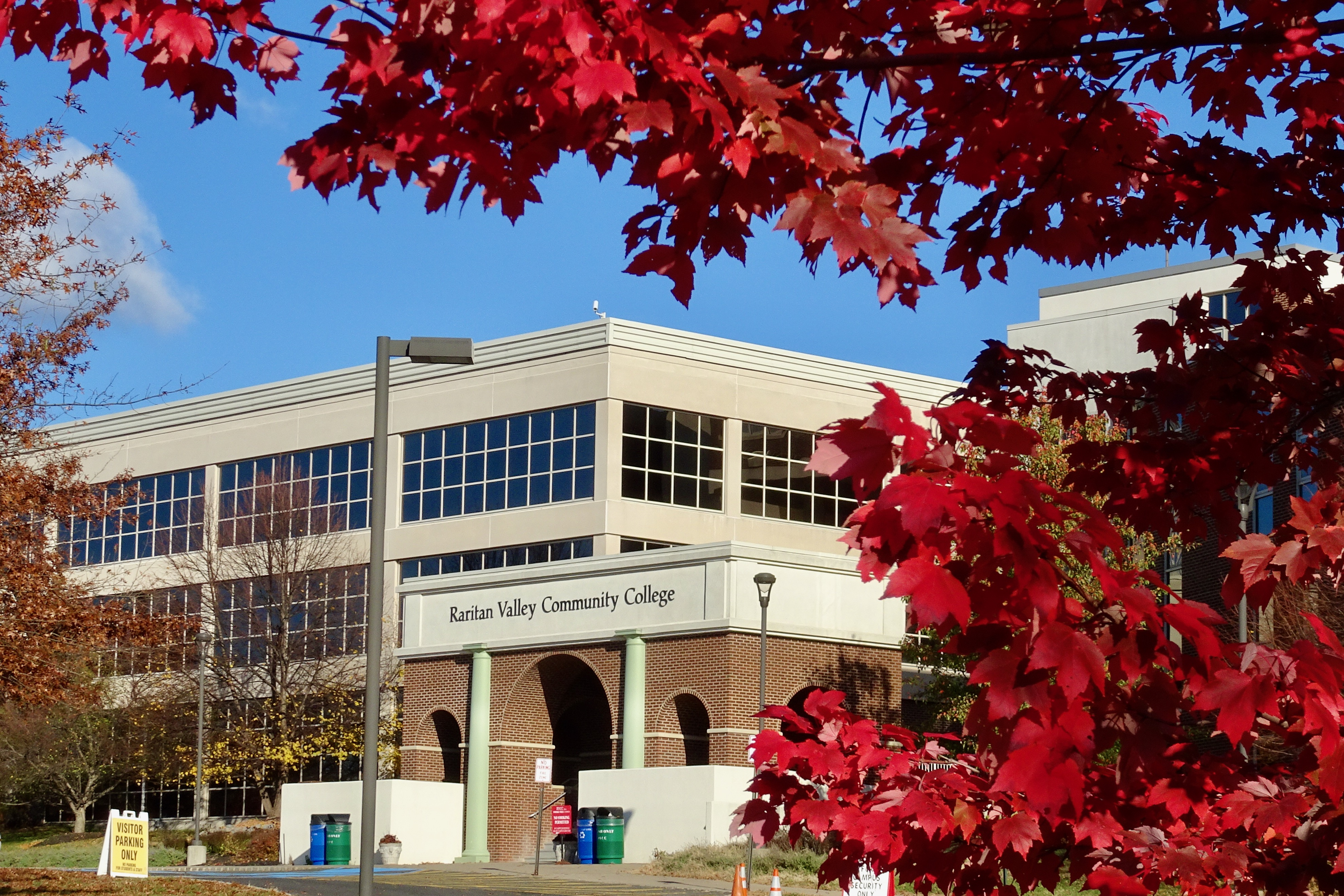
- Raritan Valley Community College

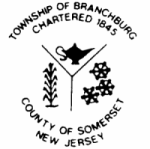
- Seal

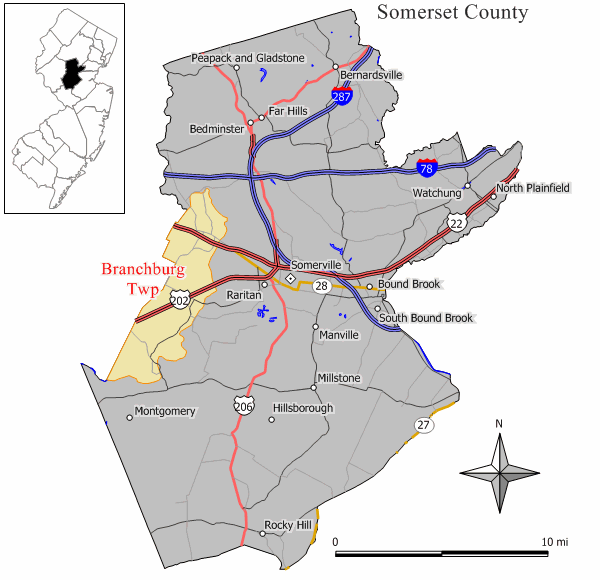
- Location of Branchburg Township in Somerset County highlighted in yellow (right). Inset map: Location of Somerset County in New Jersey highlighted in black (left).

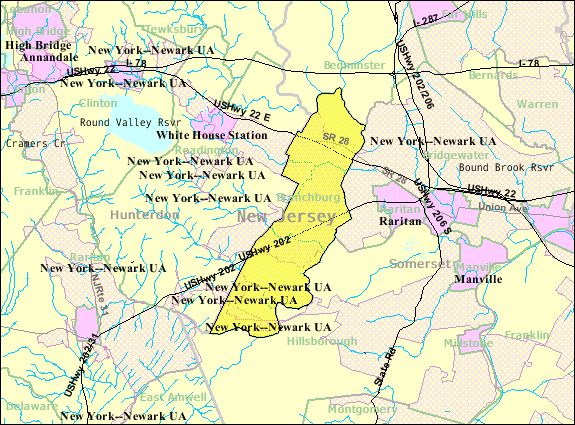
- Census Bureau map of Branchburg Township, New Jersey

- Location in Somerset County Location in New Jersey Location in the United States
- Coordinates: 40°33′37.44″N 74°42′52.92″W
- Country: United States
- State: New Jersey
- County: Somerset
- Incorporated: April 5, 1845
- Named after: Raritan River juncture

Government
  - Type: Township
  - Body: Township Committee
  - Mayor: James Schworn (R, December 31, 2026)
  - Administrator: Gregory J. Bonin
  - Municipal clerk: Maggie Schmitt

Area
  - Total: 20.30 sq mi (52.58 km^{2})
  - Land: 20.07 sq mi (51.98 km^{2})
  - Water: 0.23 sq mi (0.60 km^{2}) 1.14%
  - Rank: 141st of 565 in state 7th of 21 in county
- Elevation: 161 ft (49 m)

Population (2020)
  - Total: 14,940
  - Estimate (2023): 15,246
  - Rank: 177th of 565 in state 8th of 21 in county
  - Density: 744.4/sq mi (287.4/km^{2})
  - Rank: 414th of 565 in state 15th of 21 in county
- Time zone: UTC−05:00 (Eastern (EST))
  - Summer (DST): UTC−04:00 (Eastern (EDT))
- ZIP Code: 08853 – Neshanic Station; 08876 – Somerville
- Area code: 908
- FIPS code: 3403507180
- GNIS feature ID: 0882175
- Website: www.branchburg.nj.us

Branchburg is a township in Somerset County, in the U.S. state of New Jersey. As of the 2020 United States census, the township's population was 14,940, its highest decennial census count ever and an increase of 481 (+3.3%) from the 2010 census count of 14,459, which in turn had reflected a decline of 107 (−0.7%) from the 14,566 counted at the 2000 census.

== History ==
While the area of today's Branchburg has a history antedating the American Revolutionary War, the township itself was incorporated by an act of the New Jersey Legislature on April 5, 1845, from portions of Bridgewater Township. The township is named for its location at a point where branches of the Raritan River merge.

The land that is now known as Branchburg Township was originally inhabited by the Raritans, a tribe of the Lenni Lenape Native Americans. By 1686 most of the land was purchased from the Lenape by the Lords Proprietors of East Jersey, who sold the land in small parcels to numerous settlers, mostly of Dutch or English extraction. With the 1688 redrawing of the boundary between East and West Jersey, the Branchburg region was split between Essex County to the north and the newly formed Somerset County to the south. With Somerset's acquisition of territory from Essex and Middlesex Counties in 1741, Branchburg lay entirely within Somerset County.

Bridgewater Township was chartered in 1749. The residents of the part of Bridgewater west of the Raritan River petitioned the New Jersey Legislature for incorporation as a separate township, which was granted by an act dated April 5, 1845. The first town meeting was held April 14, 1845, in White Oak Tavern, a stagecoach stop and local meeting place along the Old York Road.

== Geography ==
According to the United States Census Bureau, the township had a total area of 20.30 square miles (52.58 km^{2}), including 20.07 square miles (51.98 km^{2}) of land and 0.23 square miles (0.6 km^{2}) of water (1.14%).

The township is 11 miles (18 km) long and approximately 2 miles (3.2 km) across at its widest point. Unincorporated communities, localities and place names located partially or completely within the township include Burnt Mill, Centerville, Fox Hollow, Neshanic, Neshanic Station (ZIP Code 08853) and North Branch (ZIP Code 08876), North Branch Depot and Woodfern.

The township is bordered on the west by Readington Township in Hunterdon County; on the north by Bedminster Township and on the south by Bridgewater Township and Hillsborough Township.

The main watercourses are the Lamington River on the north, the North Branch of the Raritan River on the east and the South Branch of the Raritan River on the east and south. These rivers along with small streams and brooks are excellent for fishermen who enjoy trout stocked streams and rivers. Branchburg is in the Raritan Valley, a line of cities in Central New Jersey. Branchburg lies in the western division of the Raritan Valley along with Bridgewater and Raritan.

== Demographics ==
Historical population
Census	Pop.	Note	%±
1850	1,143		—
1860	1,174		2.7%
1870	1,251		6.6%
1880	1,316		5.2%
1890	1,152		−12.5%
1900	1,012		−12.2%
1910	970		−4.2%
1920	931		−4.0%
1930	1,084		16.4%
1940	1,231		13.6%
1950	1,958		59.1%
1960	3,741		91.1%
1970	5,742		53.5%
1980	7,846		36.6%
1990	10,888		38.8%
2000	14,566		33.8%
2010	14,459		−0.7%
2020	14,940		3.3%
2023 (est.)	15,246		2.0%
Population sources: 1850–1920 1850–1870; 1850 1870 1880–1890; 1890–1910 1910–1930; 1940–2000 2000; 2010 2020

=== 2010 census ===
The 2010 United States census counted 14,459 people, 5,271 households, and 4,032 families in the township. The population density was 721.4 per square mile (278.5/km^{2}). There were 5,419 housing units at an average density of 270.4 per square mile (104.4/km^{2}). The racial makeup was 86.80% (12,550) White, 2.25% (326) Black or African American, 0.15% (22) Native American, 8.40% (1,215) Asian, 0.03% (5) Pacific Islander, 0.59% (86) from other races, and 1.76% (255) from two or more races. Hispanic or Latino of any race were 4.45% (643) of the population.

Of the 5,271 households, 38.2% had children under the age of 18; 67.6% were married couples living together; 6.5% had a female householder with no husband present and 23.5% were non-families. Of all households, 18.8% were made up of individuals and 6.2% had someone living alone who was 65 years of age or older. The average household size was 2.74 and the average family size was 3.17.

26.1% of the population were under the age of 18, 5.3% from 18 to 24, 23.8% from 25 to 44, 33.9% from 45 to 64, and 11.0% who were 65 years of age or older. The median age was 42.3 years. For every 100 females, the population had 95.6 males. For every 100 females ages 18 and older there were 92.4 males.

The Census Bureau's 2006–2010 American Community Survey showed that (in 2010 inflation-adjusted dollars) median household income was $119,092 (with a margin of error of +/− $7,934) and the median family income was $136,310 (+/− $12,919). Males had a median income of $97,359 (+/− $7,041) versus $61,192 (+/− $8,826) for females. The per capita income for the borough was $51,387 (+/− $2,945). About 1.5% of families and 1.3% of the population were below the poverty line, including 0.5% of those under age 18 and 5.3% of those age 65 or over.

=== 2000 census ===
As of the 2000 United States census there were 14,566 people, 5,272 households, and 4,064 families residing in the township. The population density was 719.1 inhabitants per square mile (277.6/km^{2}). There were 5,405 housing units with an average density of 266.8 per square mile (103.0/km^{2}). The racial makeup of the township was 90.44% White, 1.95% African American, 0.10% Native American, 6.17% Asian, 0.03% Pacific Islander, 0.39% from other races, and 0.92% from two or more races. Hispanic or Latino of any race were 2.69% of the population.

There were 5,272 households, out of which 39.7% had children under the age of 18 living with them, 69.6% were married couples living together, 5.5% had a female householder with no husband present, and 22.9% were non-families. 18.8% of all households were made up of individuals, and 5.0% had someone living alone who was 65 years of age or older. The average household size was 2.76 and the average family size was 3.19.

In the township the population was spread out, with 27.3% under the age of 18, 4.5% from 18 to 24, 34.6% from 25 to 44, 25.3% from 45 to 64 and 8.3% who were 65 years of age or older. The median age was 38 years. For every 100 females, there were 96.4 males. For every 100 females age 18 and over, there were 93.2 males.

The median income for a household in the township was $96,864, and the median income for a family was $110,268. Males had a median income of $70,726 versus $47,786 for females. The per capita income for the township was $41,241. About 1.1% of families and 1.9% of the population were living below the poverty line, including 1.4% of those under age 18 and 5.0% of those age 65 or over.

== Economy ==
Branchburg Township is the home to the 31 Tannery Project which serves as the corporate headquarters for Ferreira Construction, the Ferreira Group, and Noveda Technologies. The 42,000-square-foot (3,900 m^{2}) office and shop building was constructed in 2006. It was the first building in the state of New Jersey to meet New Jersey's Executive Order 54 and the first net zero electric commercial building in the United States.

== Sports ==
Branchburg is home to the 2012 14U Babe Ruth World Series Championship baseball team, the first from the state since 1989. The underdog Bulldogs, consisting of players drawn from a tryout pool totaling 16 players, competed and won against teams drawn from tryout pools as large as 500 players.

== Government ==
=== Local government ===
Branchburg Township operates under the Township form of New Jersey municipal government, one of 141 municipalities (of the 564) statewide that use this form, the second-most commonly used form of government in the state. The Township Committee is comprised of five members, who are elected directly by the voters at-large in partisan elections to serve three-year terms of office on a staggered basis, with either one or two seats coming up for election each year as part of the November general election in a three-year cycle. The township has been governed by a five-member Township Council since the 1971 elections, when the population surpassed 4,000 in the 1970 United States census, mandating an expansion from the three-member committee that had been in place until then. A mayor and deputy mayor are selected from among the council from among its members at an annual reorganization meeting.

As of 2024, members of the Township Committee are Mayor Thomas L. Young (Republican Party, term on committee and as mayor ends December 31, 2025), Deputy Mayor Brendon Beatrice (R, term on committee ends 2027; term as deputy mayor ends 2025), Anna P. Columbus (R, 2027), David Owens (R, 2025) and James G. Schworn (R, 2026).

In January 2020, the Township Committee chose David Owens from a list of three candidates nominated by the Republican municipal committee to fill the vacant seat expiring in December 2022 that had been held by Robert Petrelli until he resigned immediately after his new three-year term started.

In July 2015, Patricia Rees resigned from office, citing her employment by the nonpartisan New Jersey School Board Association.

=== Federal, state and county representation ===
Branchburg Township is located in the 7th Congressional District and is part of New Jersey's 16th state legislative district.

For the 119th United States Congress, New Jersey's 7th congressional district is represented by Thomas Kean Jr. (R, Westfield). New Jersey is represented in the United States Senate by Democrats Cory Booker (Newark, term ends 2027) and Andy Kim (Moorestown, term ends 2031).

For the 2026–2027 session, the 16th legislative district of the New Jersey Legislature is represented in the New Jersey Senate by Andrew Zwicker (D, South Brunswick) and in the General Assembly by Mitchelle Drulis (D, East Amwell Township) and Roy Freiman (D, Hillsborough Township).

Somerset County is governed by a five-member Board of County Commissioners, whose members are elected at-large to three-year terms of office on a staggered basis, with one or two seats coming up for election each year. At an annual reorganization meeting held in the first week of January, the board selects a Director and deputy director from among its members. As of 2025, Somerset County's County Commissioners are Director Shanel Robinson (D, Franklin Township, term as commissioner ends 2027; term as director ends 2026), Deputy Director Paul Drake (D, Hillsborough Township, term as commissioner and as deputy director ends 2026), Melonie Marano (D, Green Brook Township, 2028), Elizabeth Graner (D, Bernards Township, 2026; elected to serve an unexpired term) and Sara Sooy (D, Bedminster Township, 2027).

Constitutional officers, elected on a countywide basis are Clerk Steve Peter (D, Somerville, 2027), Sheriff Darrin Russo (D, Franklin Township, 2028) and Surrogate Bernice "Tina" Jalloh (D, Franklin Township, 2030).

=== Politics ===
As of March 2011, there were a total of 9,970 registered voters in Branchburg Township, of which 1,832 (18.4% vs. 26.0% countywide) were registered as Democrats, 3,650 (36.6% vs. 25.7%) were registered as Republicans and 4,484 (45.0% vs. 48.2%) were registered as Unaffiliated. There were 4 voters registered as Libertarians or Greens. Among the township's 2010 Census population, 69.0% (vs. 60.4% in Somerset County) were registered to vote, including 93.2% of those ages 18 and over (vs. 80.4% countywide).

United States presidential election results for Branchburg
Year	Republican		Democratic		Third party(ies)	
Year	No.	%	No.	%	No.	%
2024	4,888	51.64%	4,390	46.38%	188	1.99%
2020	4,865	50.13%	4,665	48.07%	174	1.79%
2016	4,466	55.35%	3,285	40.72%	317	3.93%
2012	4,537	60.24%	2,902	38.53%	92	1.22%
2008	4,651	58.76%	3,172	40.08%	92	1.16%
2004	4,706	61.76%	2,835	37.20%	79	1.04%
2000	3,659	58.35%	2,421	38.61%	191	3.05%

In the 2012 presidential election, Republican Mitt Romney received 60.2% of the vote (4,537 cast), ahead of Democrat Barack Obama with 38.5% (2,902 votes), and other candidates with 1.2% (92 votes), among the 7,568 ballots cast by the township's 10,499 registered voters (37 ballots were spoiled), for a turnout of 72.1%. In the 2008 presidential election, Republican John McCain received 4,651 votes (58.5% vs. 46.1% countywide), ahead of Democrat Barack Obama with 3,172 votes (39.9% vs. 52.1%) and other candidates with 92 votes (1.2% vs. 1.1%), among the 7,956 ballots cast by the township's 9,643 registered voters, for a turnout of 82.5% (vs. 78.7% in Somerset County). In the 2004 presidential election, Republican George W. Bush received 4,706 votes (61.6% vs. 51.5% countywide), ahead of Democrat John Kerry with 2,835 votes (37.1% vs. 47.2%) and other candidates with 79 votes (1.0% vs. 0.9%), among the 7,639 ballots cast by the township's 9,087 registered voters, for a turnout of 84.1% (vs. 81.7% in the whole county).

Gubernatorial election results for Branchburg
Year	Republican		Democratic		Third party(ies)	
Year	No.	%	No.	%	No.	%
2025	4,024	52.13%	3,644	47.21%	51	0.66%
2021	3,879	59.40%	2,608	39.94%	43	0.66%
2017	3,097	61.31%	1,850	36.63%	104	2.06%
2013	3,651	77.06%	1,010	21.32%	77	1.63%
2009	3,945	69.42%	1,266	22.28%	472	8.31%
2005	3,262	64.42%	1,559	30.79%	243	4.80%

In the 2013 gubernatorial election, Republican Chris Christie received 77.1% of the vote (3,651 cast), ahead of Democrat Barbara Buono with 21.3% (1,010 votes), and other candidates with 1.6% (77 votes), among the 4,804 ballots cast by the township's 10,612 registered voters (66 ballots were spoiled), for a turnout of 45.3%. In the 2009 gubernatorial election, Republican Chris Christie received 3,945 votes (69.1% vs. 55.8% countywide), ahead of Democrat Jon Corzine with 1,266 votes (22.2% vs. 34.1%), Independent Chris Daggett with 445 votes (7.8% vs. 8.7%) and other candidates with 27 votes (0.5% vs. 0.7%), among the 5,706 ballots cast by the township's 9,777 registered voters, yielding a 58.4% turnout (vs. 52.5% in the county).

United States Senate election results for Branchburg1
Year	Republican		Democratic		Third party(ies)	
Year	No.	%	No.	%	No.	%
2024	4,826	52.56%	4,176	45.48%	180	1.96%
2018	3,967	57.72%	2,672	38.88%	234	3.40%
2012	4,306	60.13%	2,707	37.80%	148	2.07%
2006	2,903	59.93%	1,773	36.60%	168	3.47%

United States Senate election results for Branchburg2
Year	Republican		Democratic		Third party(ies)	
Year	No.	%	No.	%	No.	%
2020	5,088	53.17%	4,366	45.63%	115	1.20%
2014	2,335	63.75%	1,260	34.40%	68	1.86%
2013	1,980	64.56%	1,059	34.53%	28	0.91%
2008	4,759	63.29%	2,533	33.69%	227	3.02%

== Emergency services ==
Branchburg Township is served by three major Emergency Services; a full-time Police Department, an all-volunteer Emergency Medical & Rescue Services Squad, and four all-volunteer Fire Departments.

=== Police ===
The Branchburg Police Department, under the direction of Chief David Young, was established on June 16, 1980. The Department currently has 26 full-time sworn officers, two civilian employees, seven crossing guards, and 13 Emergency Management volunteers. The Department has specialized units of officers who have taken on duties in addition to their patrol or detective work. These include the Detective Bureau, Juvenile Officer, School Resources, Traffic Safety, Community Policing, Services, Bike Patrol, First-Aid, Explorers program and Emergency Management.

On January 26, 2010, a clerk at the QuickChek store in Branchburg called officers about a suspicious person in the store. Officers arrested Lloyd Woodson, and found in his possession and in his motel room a large weapons cache that included illegal weapons and ammunition, a detailed map of Fort Drum, and a traditional red-and-white Middle Eastern headdress. He was charged on multiple state and federal weapons charges. The three officers who responded to the call received an Exceptional Duty Award for their actions.

=== EMS and rescue services ===
Emergency Medical Services and Rescue Services are provided throughout the Township by the Branchburg Rescue Squad, which was formed in October 1955 and continues to serve the residents and businesses on an all-volunteer basis, relying solely on donations received from the community. Services provided include Basic Life Support, Emergency Medical Services (BLS/EMS), NFPA Technician Level: Vehicle Extrication, Water Rescue, Confined Space, Rope Rescue, High Angle Rescue NFPA Operations Level: Ice Rescue NFPA Awareness Level: Trench Collapse, Building & Structural Collapse. Operating out of Station 74 Rescue at 113 River Road are three BLS Ambulances, a Heavy Rescue Services Unit, one Rescue Services Unit, one First Responder/Command Unit and two inflatable rescue boats.

=== Fire departments ===
The Township of Branchburg is covered by four volunteer fire departments: North Branch Volunteer Fire Company in the north, Readington Volunteer Fire Company to the west, Neshanic Volunteer Fire Department on the south and Country Hills Volunteer Fire Company covering the central portion of the township.

== Education ==
The Branchburg Township School District serves public school students in pre-kindergarten through eighth grade. As of the 2024–25 school year, the district, comprised of three schools, had an enrollment of 1,396 students and 163.0 classroom teachers (on an FTE basis), for a student–teacher ratio of 8.6:1. Schools in the district (with 2024–25 enrollment data from the National Center for Education Statistics) are Whiton Elementary School with 617 students in grades PreK–3, Stony Brook School with 310 students in grades 4–5 and Branchburg Central Middle School with 458 students in grades 6–8.

The public secondary school serving Branchburg for ninth through twelfth grades is Somerville High School, which students attend as part of a sending/receiving relationship with the Somerville Public Schools. As of the 2024–25 school year, the high school had an enrollment of 1,072 students and 94.0 classroom teachers (on an FTE basis), for a student–teacher ratio of 11.4:1.

Midland School is a non-profit special education school serving the individual social, emotional, academic and career needs of children with developmental disabilities. The school serves 245 students, ranging in age from 5 to 21 years old, from central and northern New Jersey.

Branchburg Township is the home of the main campus of Raritan Valley Community College.

== Transportation ==
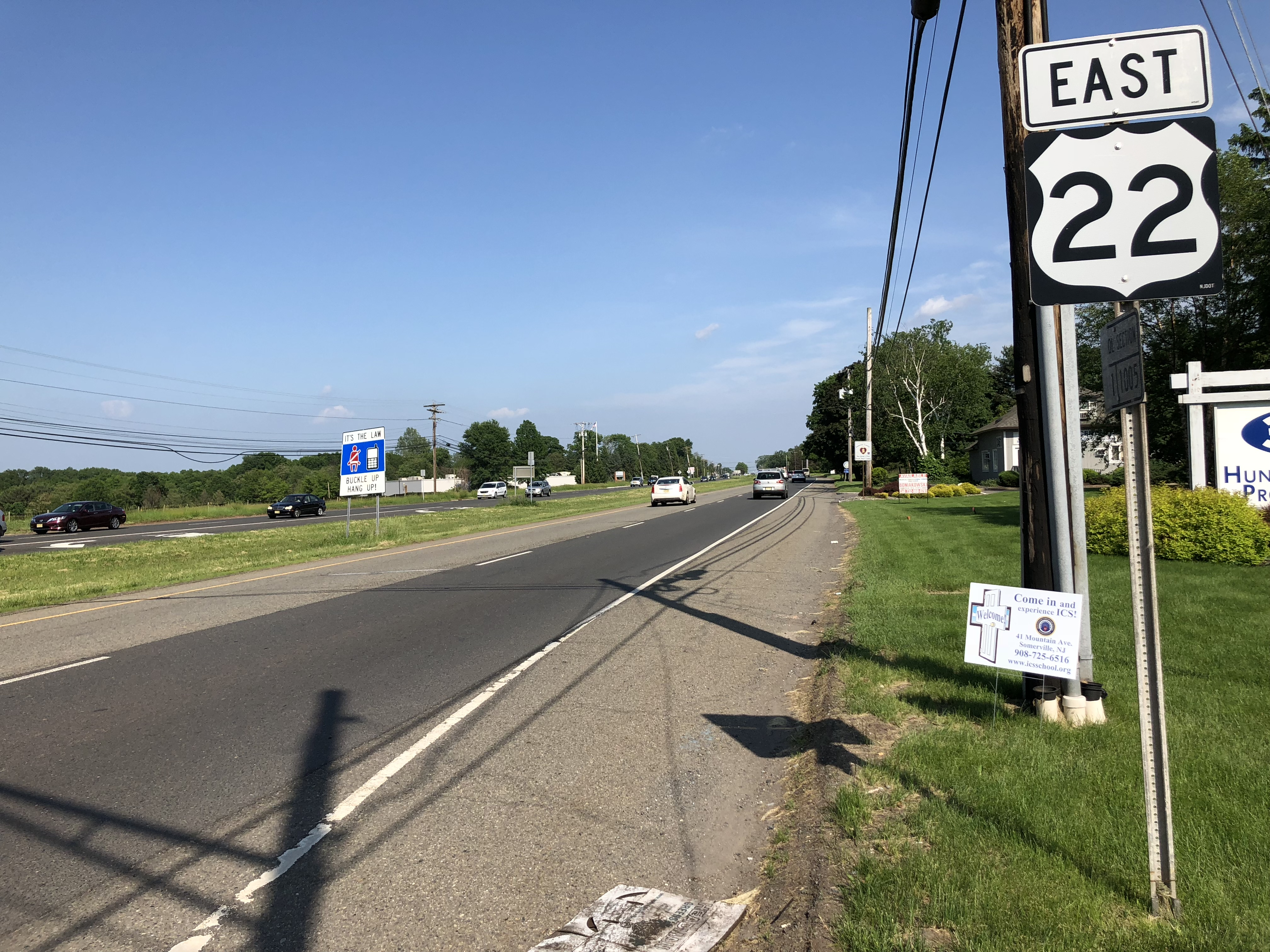
U.S. Route 22 in Branchburg

=== Roads and highways ===
As of May 2010, the township had a total of 113.08 miles (181.98 km) of roadways, of which 87.96 miles (141.56 km) were maintained by the municipality, 18.74 miles (30.16 km) by Somerset County and 6.38 miles (10.27 km) by the New Jersey Department of Transportation.

Branchburg Township is centrally located with access to major roadways and highways. U.S. Route 202 and U.S. Route 22 travel through the township with easy passage to Interstate 78, Interstate 287, Garden State Parkway, and Route 206, enabling residents to travel to New York City and Philadelphia within one hour.

=== Rail and Public transportation ===
NJ Transit train service between Branchburg and New York City is available at the North Branch station (located on Station Road), which offers limited daily service and no weekend trains. The Raritan Valley Line has weekly service from North Branch Station to Newark Penn Station, where connections can be made to New York Penn Station in Midtown Manhattan.

The Norfolk Southern Railway's Lehigh Line (formerly the mainline of the Lehigh Valley Railroad), runs through Branchburg.

NJ Transit offers bus service to and from Newark on the 65 line with local service on the 884 route.

Trans-Bridge Lines offers bus service between New Hope, Pennsylvania, and New York City, with a stop at the Municipal Park-and-Ride facility on Route 202 North on a daily basis, with westbound service on the Doylestown route to Bethlehem, Pennsylvania, and eastbound to Newark Liberty International Airport and the Port Authority Bus Terminal in Midtown Manhattan.

Transport of New Jersey bus service between New York City and Allentown, Pennsylvania, is available on a daily basis.

Newark Liberty International Airport is located approximately 35 miles (56 km) northeast of Branchburg. Also within driving distance are Lehigh Valley International Airport (ABE, formerly Allentown-Bethlehem-Easton International Airport) near Allentown, Pennsylvania, John F. Kennedy International Airport and La Guardia Airport in New York, as well as the Trenton-Mercer Airport near Trenton and Princeton in Mercer County.

== Points of interest ==
The South Branch Schoolhouse, located on South Branch Road, is a one-room schoolhouse built in 1873, the last one-room school house in use in the county. Its purpose was to educate children in grades 1–8 from Branchburg and Hillsborough townships. It was closed in 1965. In 2007 the schoolhouse was renovated to add the bell tower back onto the top of the building. Also known as the Little Red Schoolhouse, it is now owned by the township of Branchburg. Notable students at the Little Red Schoolhouse include opera star and Edison protégé Anna Case and Marion Van Fleet, the mother of actor Lee Van Cleef. It was added to the National Register of Historic Places in 2005 for its significance in architecture and education.

The Neshanic Station Historic District was added to the NRHP in 2016 for its significance in community development. It includes the Neshanic Station Lenticular Truss Bridge crossing the South Branch Raritan River.

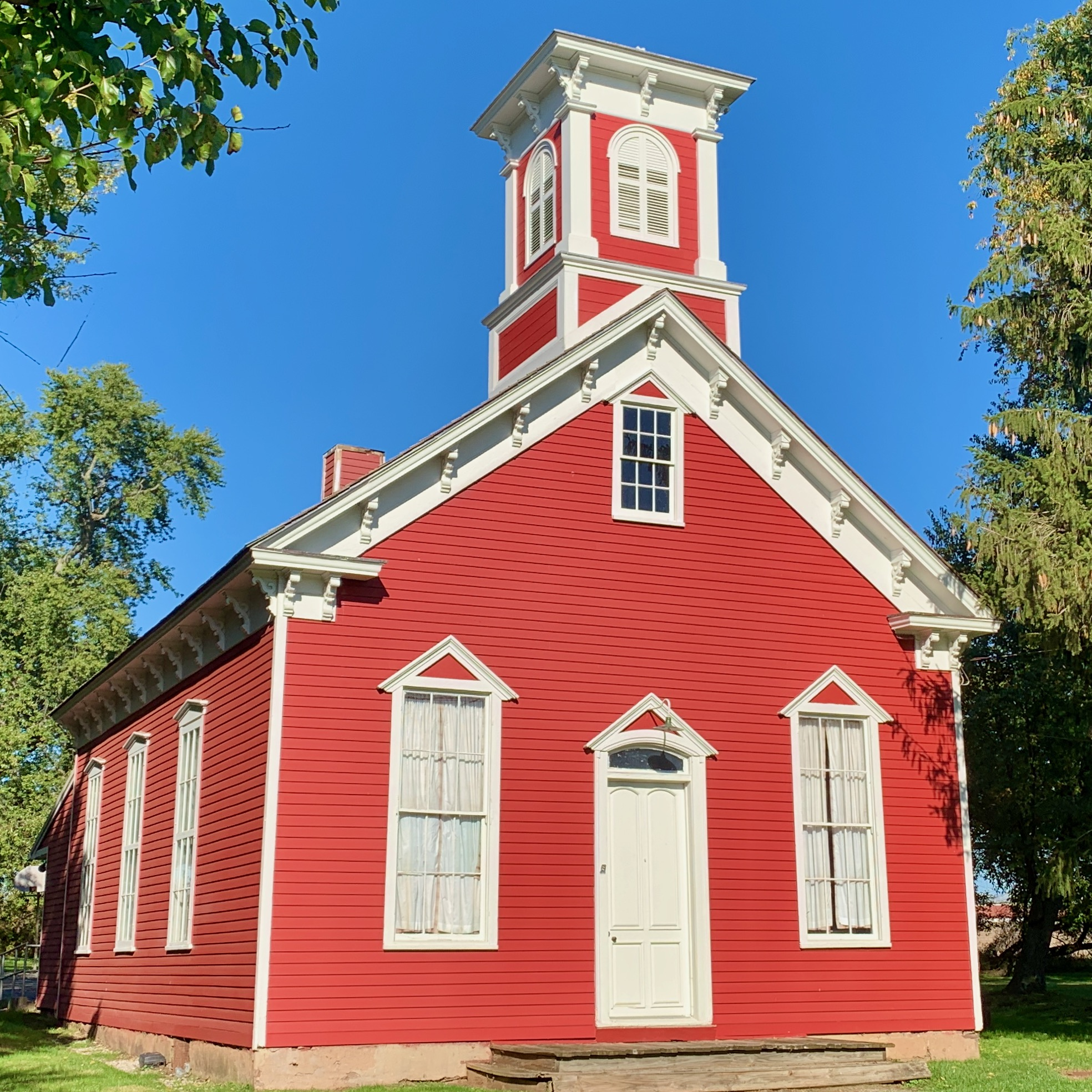
South Branch Schoolhouse

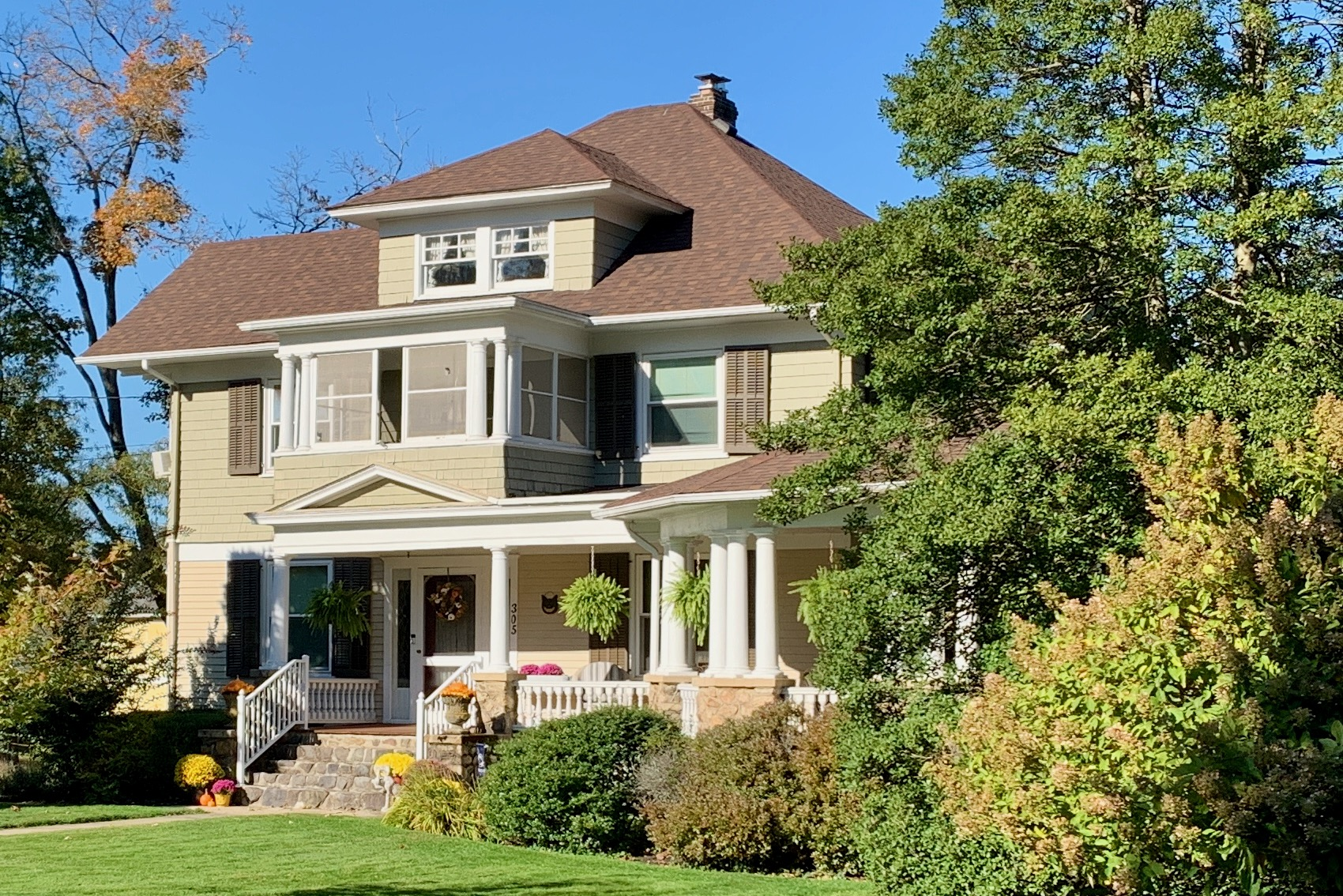
Colonial Revival style house in Neshanic Station

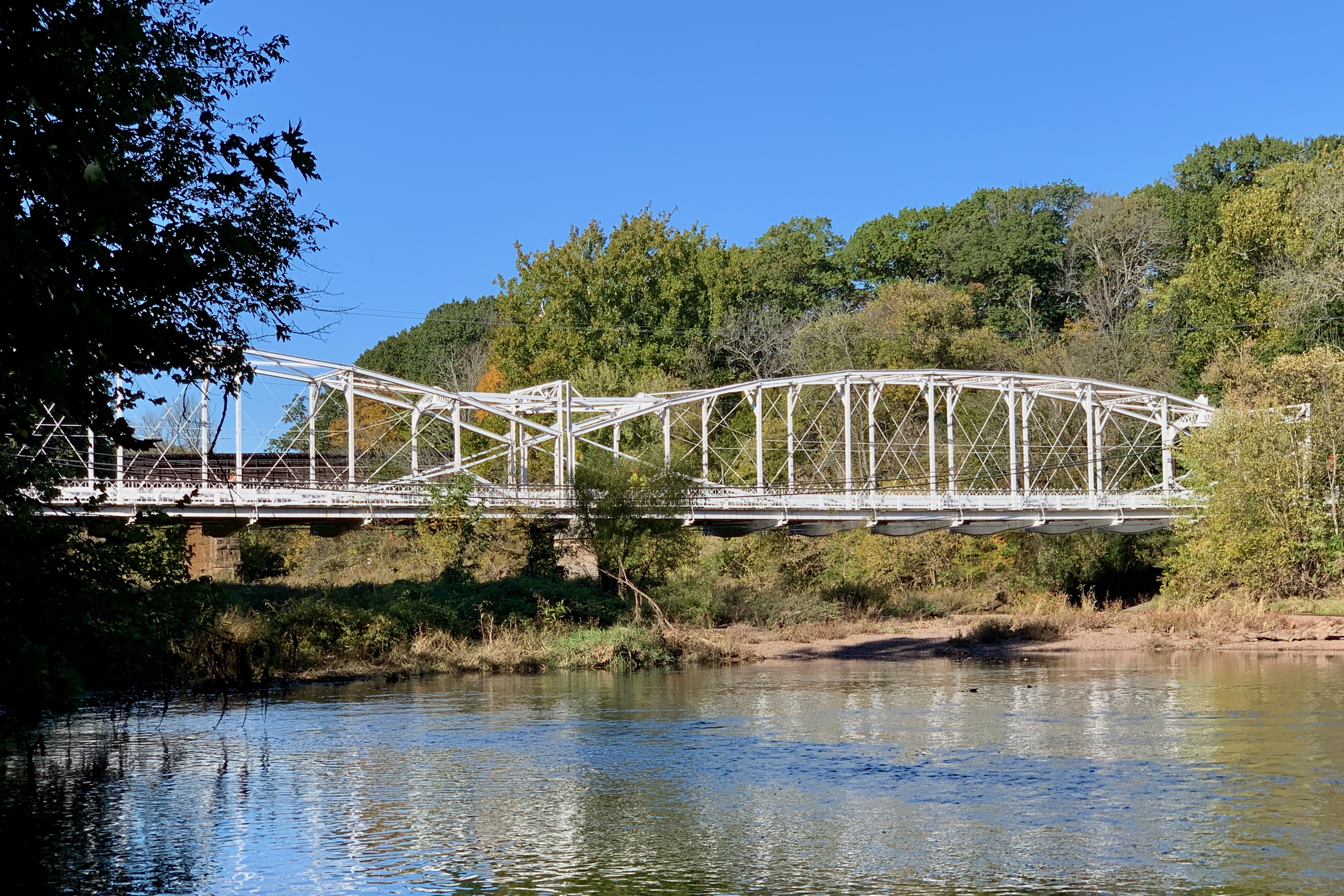
Neshanic Station Lenticular Truss Bridge

== Notable people ==
People who were born in, residents of, or otherwise closely associated with Branchburg include:

- Christopher Bateman (born 1957), member of the New Jersey Senate representing the 16th Legislative District, who served as mayor of Branchburg in 1986
- Raymond Bateman (1927–2016), politician, who represented Somerset County in the New Jersey Senate in the 1960s and 1970s and was the Republican candidate for Governor of New Jersey in 1977
- Sean Baker (born 1971), Palme d'Or winning, Oscar nominated film director
- Frank Chapot (1932–2016), Olympic silver medalist equestrian
- Jeffrey Chiesa (born 1965), New Jersey Attorney General who was named to the United States Senate to fill Frank Lautenberg's vacant seat on an interim basis from June 2013 until the October 2013 special election, when Cory Booker took office
- Robert Cox (1813–1890), politician who served in the Michigan House of Representatives
- Denise Coyle (born 1953), member of the New Jersey General Assembly from 2008 to 2012 who served as mayor of Branchburg in 1993
- Mary Eccles, Viscountess Eccles (1912–2003), book collector and author, who established one of the largest private collections of 18th century literature
- Anthony Gargiulo (born 1984), defensive end who played in the Canadian Football League for the Calgary Stampeders
- Bob Masterson (1915–1994), American football end who played in the National Football League for the Washington Redskins
- Brendan O'Hare, comedian known for his absurdist humor and podcast, This Is Branchburg

== See also ==
- 2024 New Jersey drone sightings
