= Jon Williams (American football) =

American football player (born 1961)

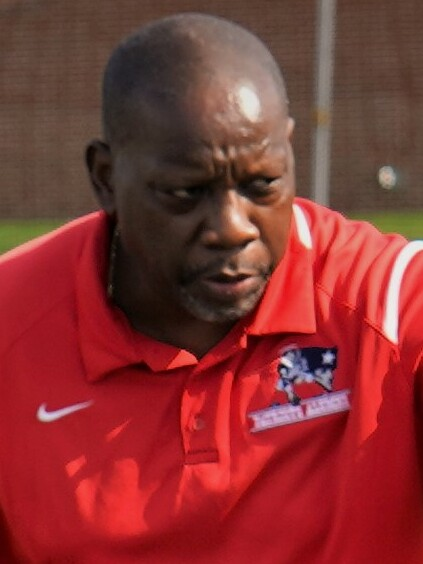
- Williams in 2023

No. 44
- Position: Running back

Personal information
- Born: June 1, 1961 (age 65); South Bend, Indiana, U.S.
- Listed height: 5 ft 9 in (1.75 m)
- Listed weight: 210 lb (95 kg)

Career information
- High school: Somerville (Somerville, New Jersey)
- College: Penn State
- NFL draft: 1984: 3rd round, 70th overall pick

Career history
- New England Patriots (1984)

Awards and highlights
- National champion (1982); Second-team All-East (1982)
- Stats at Pro Football Reference

Jonathan Williams (born June 1, 1961) is an American former professional football player who was a running back in the National Football League (NFL). He was selected in the third round by and played for the New England Patriots in 1984.

Raised in Somerville, New Jersey, Williams played football at Somerville High School.
