= Neshanic, New Jersey =

Populated place in Somerset County, New Jersey, US

- Census-designated place
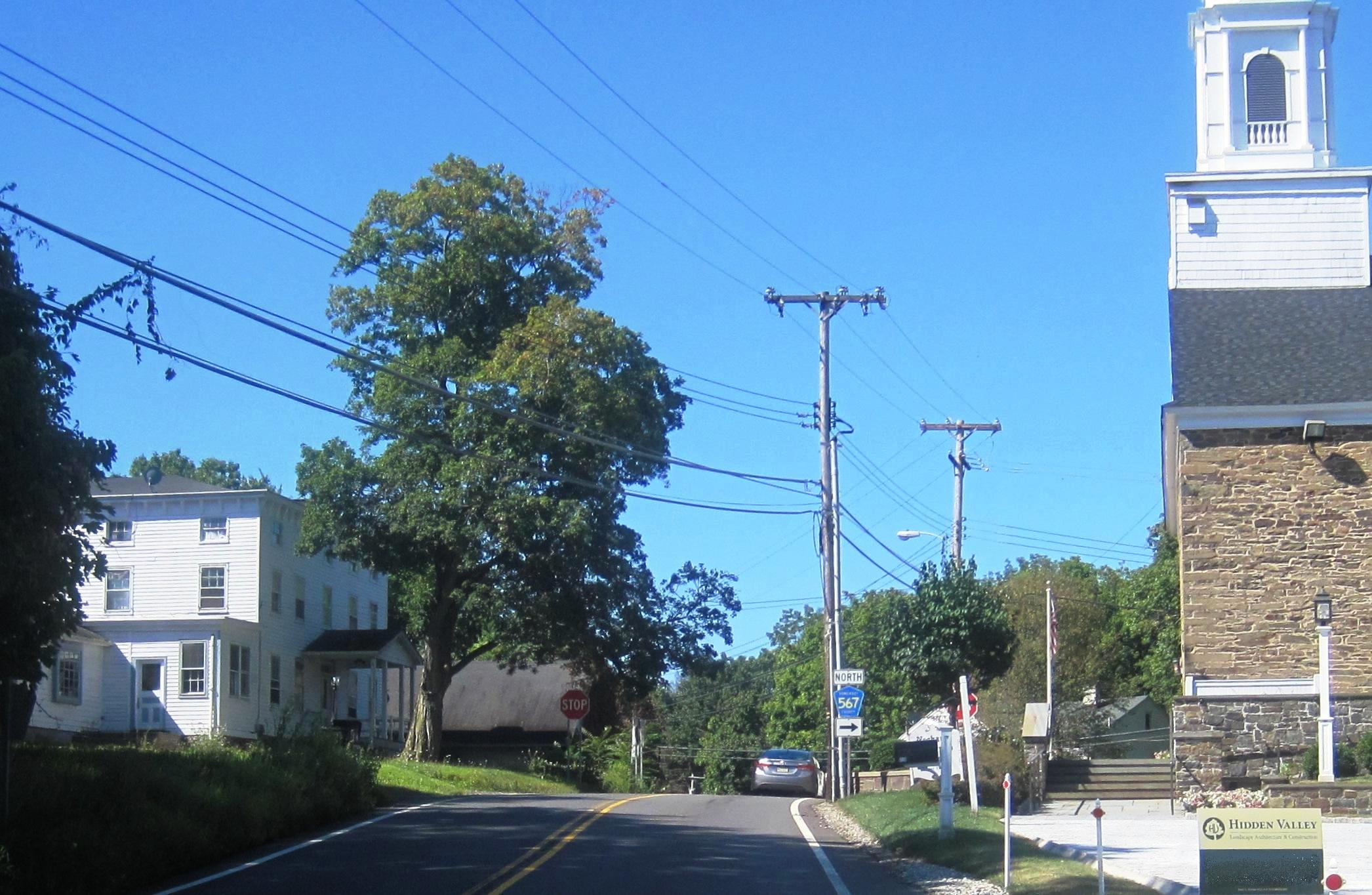
- Neshanic along Amwell Road (CR 514)

- Location in Somerset County Location in New Jersey Location in the United States
- Coordinates: 40°29′52″N 74°43′12″W
- Country: United States
- State: New Jersey
- County: Somerset
- Township: Hillsborough

Area
  - Total: 3.60 sq mi (9.33 km^{2})
  - Land: 3.57 sq mi (9.25 km^{2})
  - Water: 0.035 sq mi (0.09 km^{2})

Population (2020)
  - Total: 854
  - Density: 239.2/sq mi (92.37/km^{2})
- Time zone: UTC−05:00 (Eastern (EST))
  - Summer (DST): UTC−04:00 (Eastern (EDT))
- FIPS code: 34-50040

Neshanic is an unincorporated community and census-designated place (CDP) located within Hillsborough Township, in Somerset County, in the U.S. state of New Jersey. It is located near the South Branch Raritan River. As of the 2020 census, Neshanic had a population of 854. The Neshanic Historic District was listed on the National Register of Historic Places in 1979.

== History ==
The name comes from a tribe of the Raritan tribe of Lenape Native Americans who lived along the river. The settlement began in 1750 by Dutch farmers, with a church, grist mill and school, as well as a tavern owned by John Bennett, which was a focus of the community. The first mill was built by Bergen Huff around 1770. There was also a tannery which supplied leather to the people of the village as well as to nearby New Brunswick. At one time the area surrounding the Shirk farm and extending along the Sourland Mountains was the largest peach producing region in the state.

== Historic district ==
- Neshanic Historic District
- U.S. National Register of Historic Places
- U.S. Historic district
- New Jersey Register of Historic Places
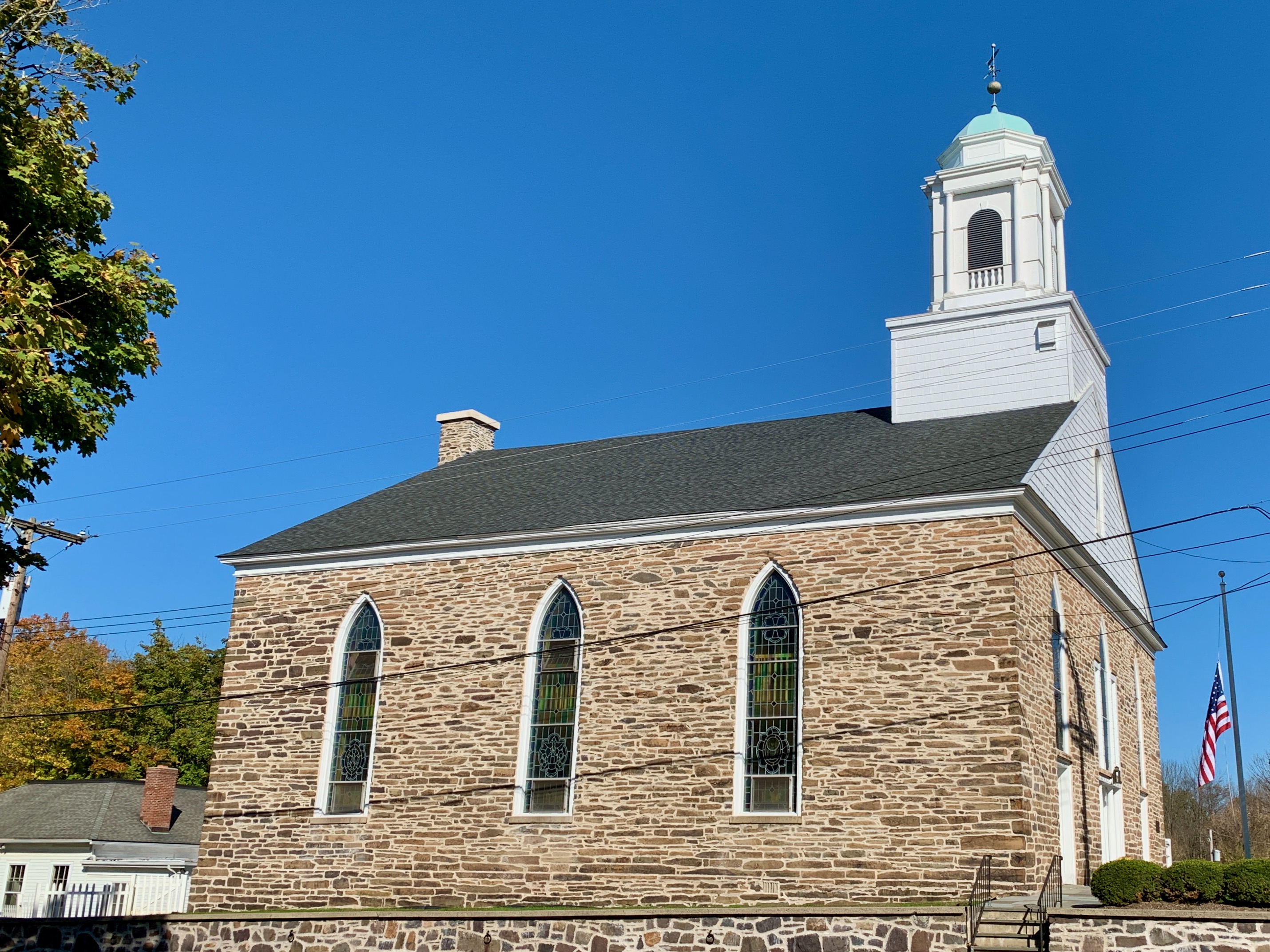
- Neshanic Reformed Church
- Location: Amwell and Zion Roads
- Area: 107 acres (43 ha)
- Built: 1750
- Architectural style: Classical/Gothic
- NRHP reference No.: 79001519
- NJRHP No.: 2523

Significant dates
- Added to NRHP: August 1, 1979
- Designated NJRHP: October 10, 1978

The Neshanic Historic District is a historic district encompassing the village. It was added to the National Register of Historic Places on August 1, 1979 for its significance in settlement and religion. It includes 23 contributing buildings.

== Demographics ==
Historical population
Census	Pop.	Note	%±
2020	854		—
U.S. Decennial Census; 2020

Neshanic was first listed as a census designated place in the 2020 United States census.

Neshanic CDP, New Jersey – Racial and ethnic composition Note: the US Census treats Hispanic/Latino as an ethnic category. This table excludes Latinos from the racial categories and assigns them to a separate category. Hispanics/Latinos may be of any race.
Race / Ethnicity (NH = Non-Hispanic)	Pop 2020	2020
White alone (NH)	678	79.39%
Black or African American alone (NH)	29	3.40%
Native American or Alaska Native alone (NH)	0	0.00%
Asian alone (NH)	42	4.92%
Native Hawaiian or Pacific Islander alone (NH)	3	0.35%
Other race alone (NH)	3	0.35%
Mixed race or Multiracial (NH)	31	3.63%
Hispanic or Latino (any race)	68	7.96%
Total	854	100.00%

As of 2020, the population was 854.

== Points of interest ==
Nearby Neshanic Mills was added to the NRHP in 1978. The original Mill was built in 1810 and the later rebuilt by Andrew Lane in 1876. It is also known as the Amerman Mill. It operated until the late 1940s and is now a private residence.

== See also ==
- Neshanic Station, New Jersey
