= 31 Tannery Project =

Office and shop building in New Jersey

Coordinates: 40.60776°N 74.72621°W

The 31 Tannery Project is an office and shop building in Branchburg, New Jersey, United States. It serves as the corporate headquarters for Ferreira Construction, the Ferreira Group, and Noveda Technologies. The 42,000-square-foot (3,900 m^{2}) building was constructed in 2006 and is the first building in the state of New Jersey to meet New Jersey's Executive Order 54. The building is also the first Net Zero Electric Commercial Building in the United States.

== Building Details ==
=== Renewable Energy System ===
- DC solar photovoltaic system of 1,276 solar panels.
- Two 100 kW AC 277/480 V three phase solar inverters.

=== HVAC System ===
- Nine miles of radiant heat (80 zones).
- 96% efficient condensing boiler plant.
- High performance rooftop units.
- Solar domestic hot water.

=== Voice/Data System ===
- Integrated Web based direct digital controls system and pervasive voice/data/video system with kiosk displays.

=== Backup Energy System ===
- Transfer switch for a future 200Kw gas-fired emergency generator.

== Building energy monitoring ==
=== SunFlow Monitor ===
- SunFlow Monitor graphically depicts the buildings renewable energy production in real-time.

=== EnergyFlow Monitor ===
- EnergyFlow Monitor graphically depicts the buildings energy consumption in real-time.

=== Facilimetrix ===
- Facilimetrix graphically depicts the buildings room temperature readings and hot water temperature readings in real-time.

=== Carbon Footprint Monitor ===
- Carbon Footprint Monitor graphically depicts the buildings impact on the environment in real-time.

== Building Recognition ==
=== State of New Jersey ===
- New Jersey Governor Jon Corzine presented the New Jersey Clean Energy Market Innovator Award

=== Energy Star ===
- EnergyStar certification with a previously unheard of perfect rating of 100.

== Sources ==
- ASHRAE High Performing Buildings, ASHRAE High Performing Buildings (PDF)
- Energy Star, ENERGY STAR Labeled Buildings and Plants
- "Ferreira Construction Building Maintains 'First Net Zero Electric' Status", Reuters, archived from the original on April 14, 2009
- Realcomm, Breaking the Net Zero Energy Barrier: The "31 Tannery Project", archived from the original on July 15, 2011
- ARTBA, ARTBA Foundation Recognizes Transportation Construction Industry Environmental Excellence, archived from the original on May 26, 2008
- NJN. YouTube. Branchburg NJ.
