= John G. Demaray =

American historian (1930–2015)

John George Demaray (November 27, 1930 – October 24, 2015) was an American medievalist.

== Biography ==
Demaray was born in Bound Brook, New Jersey, to parents John and Marjorie Coyle Demaray and raised in Somerville, New Jersey, where he graduated from Somerville High School. He served in the United States Army, and studied at Notre Dame Law School before completing a doctorate at Columbia University. Demaray met Hannah Disinger while pursuing his doctoral degree and married her in 1960. He taught at several universities, and upon retirement, was granted emeritus status at Rutgers University. Demaray died, aged 84, at Lenox Hill Hospital, where he was seeking treatment for bilateral pneumonia.

== Selected publications ==
- Demaray, John G. (1968). Milton and the Masque Tradition: The Early Poems, "Arcades," and Comus. Harvard University Press. doi:10.4159/harvard.9780674331556. ISBN 9780674331549.
- Demaray, John G. (1974). The Invention of Dante's Commedia. Yale University Press. ISBN 9780300169553.
- Demaray, John G. (1980). Milton's Theatrical Epic: The Invention and Design of Paradise Lost. Harvard University Press. doi:10.4159/harvard.9780674331570. ISBN 9780674331563.
- Demaray, John G. (1991). Cosmos and Epic Representation: Dante, Spenser, Milton, and the Transformation of Renaissance Heroic Poetry. Duquesne University Press. ISBN 9780820702315.
- Demaray, John G. (1998). Shakespeare and the Spectacles of Strangeness: The Tempest and the Transformation of Renaissance Theatrical Forms. Duquesne University Press. ISBN 9780820702841.
- Demaray, John G. (2006). Pilgrimage to History: The Renaissance and Global Historicism. AMS Press. ISBN 9780404623418.
