= Somerville High School (New Jersey) =

High school in Somerset County, New Jersey, US

Location
- 222 Davenport Street; Somerville, Somerset County, New Jersey 08876; United States; 40.577989°N 74.613026°W

Information
- Type: Public high school
- NCES School ID: 341509005284
- Principal: Gerard T. Foley
- Faculty: 94.0 FTEs
- Enrollment: 1,072 (as of 2024–25)
- Student to teacher ratio: 11.4:1
- Campus: Suburban
- Colors: Orange and Black
- Athletics conference: Skyland Conference (general); Big Central Football Conference (football)
- Team name: Pioneers
- Newspaper: Valkyrie
- Yearbook: Pioneer
- Website: www.somervilleschools.org/o/shs

Somerville High School is a four-year comprehensive public high school serving students in ninth through twelfth grades from Somerville and Branchburg Township in Somerset County, in the U.S. state of New Jersey, operating as the secondary school for Somerville Public Schools. Students from Branchburg Township attend Somerville High School as part of a sending/receiving relationship with the Branchburg Township School District.

As of the 2024–25 school year, the school had an enrollment of 1,072 students and 94.0 classroom teachers (on an FTE basis), for a student–teacher ratio of 11.4:1. There were 236 students (22.0% of enrollment) eligible for free lunch and 46 (4.3% of students) eligible for reduced-cost lunch.

Advanced Placement (AP) courses (such as AP United States Government and Politics) and the Senior Options Program at Raritan Valley Community College allow students the opportunity to earn college credits while attending high school. AP offerings include AP Biology, AP Calculus (AB/BC), AP Chemistry, AP English Literature and Composition, AP French Language, AP United States Government and Politics, AP Comparative Government and Politics, AP Music Theory, AP Physics, AP Spanish Language and AP United States History.

== History ==
In 1888, the first set of students graduated from the high school.

Students from Hillsborough Township attended Somerville High School for grades 9-12 as part of a sending/receiving relationship with the Hillsborough Township School District that ended when Hillsborough High School opened in September 1969 with 730 students in grades 9 and 10, with those in grades 11 and 12 completing their high school education in Somerville.

== Awards, recognition and rankings ==
In the 2011 "Ranking America's High Schools" issue by The Washington Post, the school was ranked 54th in New Jersey and 1,635th nationwide.

In its 2013 report on "America's Best High Schools", The Daily Beast ranked the school 911th in the nation among participating public high schools and 68th among schools in New Jersey.

The school was the 110th-ranked public high school in New Jersey out of 339 schools statewide in New Jersey Monthly magazine's September 2014 cover story on the state's "Top Public High Schools", using a new ranking methodology. The school had been ranked 76th in the state of 328 schools in 2012, after being ranked 77th in 2010 out of 322 schools listed. The magazine ranked the school 73rd in 2008 out of 316 schools.

Schooldigger.com ranked the school tied for 122nd out of 381 public high schools statewide in its 2011 rankings (a decrease of 13 positions from the 2010 ranking) which were based on the combined percentage of students classified as proficient or above proficient on the mathematics (85.0%) and language arts literacy (95.5%) components of the High School Proficiency Assessment (HSPA).

== Athletics ==
The Somerville High School Pioneers have historically competed in the Skyland Conference, which is comprised of public and private high schools located in Hunterdon, Somerset and Warren counties in west Central Jersey and operates under the supervision of the New Jersey State Interscholastic Athletic Association. With 881 students in grades 10–12, the school was classified by the NJSIAA for the 2019–20 school year as Group III for most athletic competition purposes, which included schools with an enrollment of 761 to 1,058 students in that grade range. The football team competes in Division 3 of the Big Central Football Conference, which includes 60 public and private high schools in Hunterdon, Middlesex, Somerset, Union and Warren counties, which are broken down into 10 divisions by size and location. The school was classified by the NJSIAA as Group III South for football for 2024–2026, which included schools with 695 to 882 students.

The school participates together with Middlesex High School in a joint ice hockey team with Bernards High School as the host school / lead agency. The co-op program operates under agreements scheduled to expire at the end of the 2023–24 school year.

The Pioneers football team has won eight Central Jersey Group II sectional championships: 1976, 1977, 1983, 1985, 1986, 1994 and 2017, and won the Central Jersey Group III title in 1979. The team won the program's first playoff-era title in 1976, defeating Red Bank Regional High School by a score of 27–6 in the Central Jersey Group II sectional championship game. The 1977 team finished the season with a 10–1 record after winning the Central Jersey Group III state sectional title with a 28–6 win in the playoff finals against Hightstown High School, becoming the first team to win consecutive titles in different groups in the playoff era. With a 27–14 win against Manasquan High School, the 1979 team won the Central Jersey Group III title and finished the season 11–0. The 1983 team finished the season 11-0 and extended its unbeaten streak to 14 after winning the Central Jersey Group II sectional title with a 30–6 win against West Windsor-Plainsboro High School in the championship game. The 1994 team finished the season with a 8–3 record after winning the Central Jersey Group II state sectional title with a 21–14 win against Manasquan High School in the championship game at Giants Stadium, a turnaround from an 0–9 season in 1993. Pioneer football teams reached the Central Jersey Group II sectional playoffs in 1994, 1999–2001, 2004, 2005, 2016 and 2017, winning seven Skyland Conference championships over that time period. In January 2015, former Devils owner Jeffrey Vanderbeek was named head football coach. On October 2, 2015, Somerville won its first home game in nearly three years. In the following 2016 season, Vanderbeek led the Pioneers to an undefeated regular season, the fourth in the program's history. The 2017 team won Somerville's eighth sectional championship, its first in 23 years, against Rumson-Fair Haven High School in the playoff final of the Central Jersey Group III state sectional tournament, in a game played at High Point Solutions Stadium on the campus of Rutgers University. Rumson-Fair Haven had defeated Somerville in the 2016 sectional final.

The boys' basketball team reached the Central Jersey Group sectional finals in 1992 and 2007 and won the Somerset County Tournament in 1999.

The Pioneers' baseball team has won Central Jersey Group sectional titles in 1963, 1973 and 2018. The Pioneers won the program's first Group III state title in 2018, defeating Roxbury High School 1–0 in the semifinal and Allentown High School by a score of 3–2 in the final. The team has won the Somerset County Tournament in 1974, 1987, 1992 and 1995; the program's four titles (through 2018) are the fifth-most in the tournament's history since it was established in 1973.

The boys swimming team won the Division B state championship in 1971.

The boys' wrestling team won the Central Jersey Group II sectional championship in 1991, 1992 and 2003.

The gymnastics team won the overall state championship in 1993.

The boys' soccer team won the 2006 Central Jersey Group II sectional championship with a 3–1 win over Raritan High School. In 2007, the boys soccer team repeated as sectional champion with a 2–0 win over Shore Regional High School.

The girls' soccer team defeated Shore Regional High School 3–1 to win the 2006 Central Jersey Group II sectional title.

The boys' outdoor track and field team won the Group III title in 1942 and won Group II titles in 1973, 2001, 2003–2005 and 2007. The team won 72 consecutive dual meets and was Central Jersey Group II sectional champion for eight straight seasons (2001–2008).

The boys' cross country team won the Group II state championship in 1984.

The boys' lacrosse team, founded in 2004, won Central Jersey Group II sectional championships in 2013 and 2014, compiling a 35-game home winning streak dating back to 2011.

== Robotics ==
Somerville's FIRST Robotics Competition team is Team 102, The Gearheads. Team 102 participates in the FIRST Mid-Atlantic district events.

== Administration ==
The school's principal is Gerard T. Foley. Core members of the school's administration include the vice principal.

== Notable alumni ==
- Kip Bateman (born 1957), politician who represented the 16th Legislative Districtin the New Jersey Senate from 2008 to 2022
- Raymond Bateman (born 1927, class of 1945), New Jersey Senate president (1970–1972) and Republican candidate for Governor of New Jersey (1977)
- Ryan Carty (born 1983), American football American college football coach. He is the head football coach at the University of Delaware, a position he had held since the 2022 season
- Ben Carnevale (1915–2008, class of 1934), basketball coach inducted into the Basketball Hall of Fame in 1970
- John G. Demaray (1930–2015), medievalist
- Barbara L. Drinkwater (1926–2019, class of 1944), specialist in sports physiology who was the first woman to be president of the American College of Sports Medicine
- William "Billy" Garland (born 1949, class of 1968), former member of the Black Panther Party and biological father of rapper Tupac Shakur.
- Joe Lis (1946–2010, class of 1964), Major League Baseball player
- Brendan O'Hare, comedian known for his absurdist humor and podcast, This Is Branchburg
- Frank Perantoni (1923-1991), American football center who played professional football for the New York Yankees
- Paul Robeson (1898–1976, class of 1915), athlete, bass-baritone, concert singer, and civil rights activist
- Elliott F. Smith (1931–1987), politician who served in the New Jersey General Assembly from 1978 to 1984, where he represented the 16th Legislative District
- Lee van Cleef (1925–1989, class of 1943), character actor who starred in Sergio Leone's The Good, the Bad and the Ugly
- Fred Wenz (1941–2020), middle relief pitcher in Major League Baseball who played for the Boston Red Sox and Philadelphia Phillies
- Jon Williams (born 1961), former NFL running back who played for the New England Patriots in 1984
