= South Branch Schoolhouse =

- U.S. National Register of Historic Places
- New Jersey Register of Historic Places
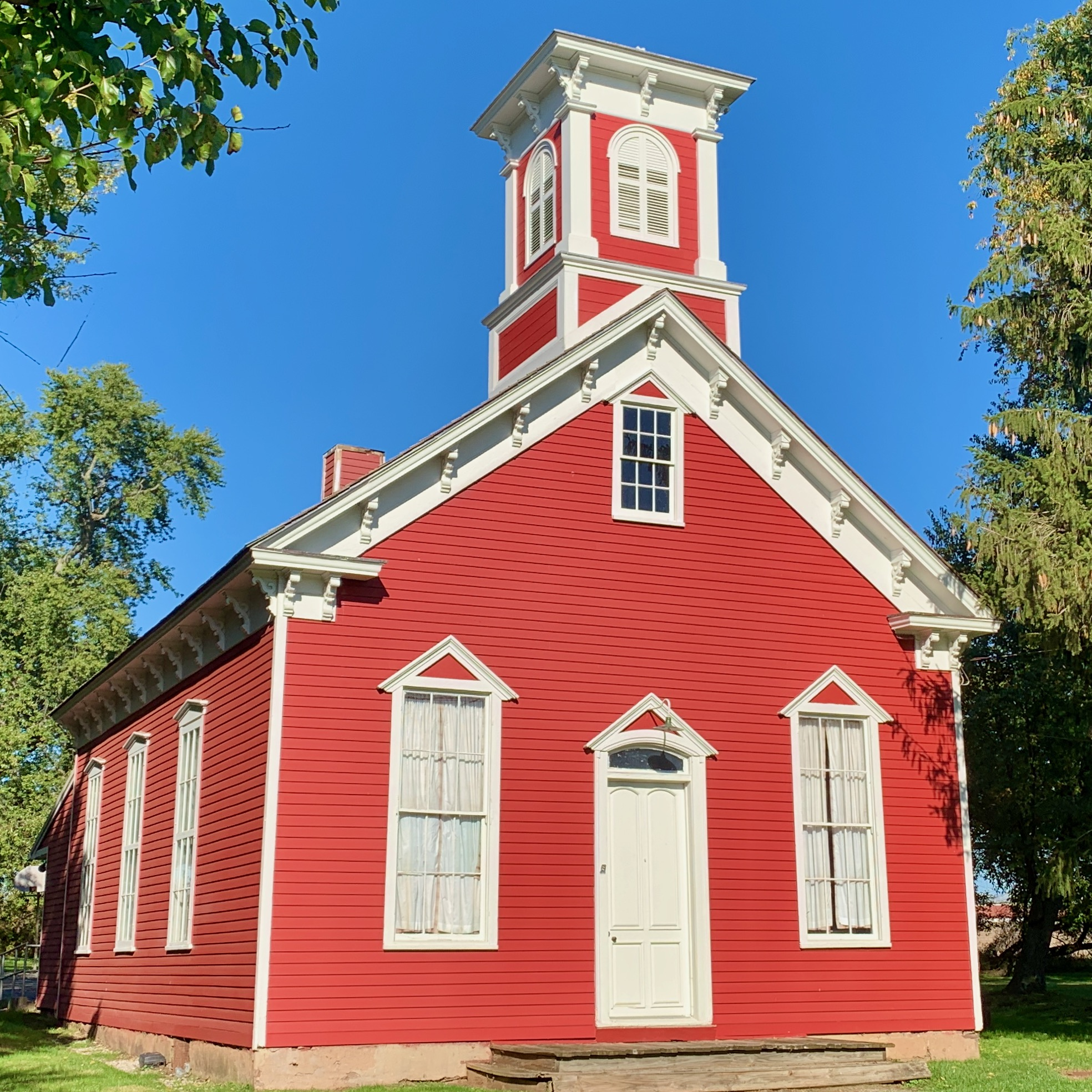
- South Branch Schoolhouse in 2020

- Location within Somerset County, New Jersey Location within New Jersey Location within the United States
- Location: 2120 South Branch Road, Branchburg, New Jersey
- Coordinates: 40°32′53″N 74°42′01″W
- Built: 1873
- Architectural style: Late Victorian, Italianate
- NRHP reference No.: 05000221
- NJRHP No.: 4031

Significant dates
- Added to NRHP: March 30, 2005
- Designated NJRHP: February 14, 2005

The South Branch Schoolhouse, also known as the Little Red Schoolhouse, is a historic building located at 2120 South Branch Road in the township of Branchburg in Somerset County, New Jersey, United States. It was built in 1873 with Late Victorian / Italianate style. The schoolhouse was added to the National Register of Historic Places on March 30, 2005, for its significance in architecture and education.

== History and description ==
The Late Victorian style building is a rural one-room schoolhouse built in 1873 near the community of South Branch and the South Branch Raritan River. It is a one-story gable-fronted frame structure featuring a belfry with Italianate style. It was used for education until 1950. It was purchased by the township in 1963 and is now used as a community center.

== See also ==
- National Register of Historic Places listings in Somerset County, New Jersey
