= Brendan O'Hare (writer) =

TV writer and online personality

Brendan O'Hare is an American writer, humorist, and Twitter personality. He has written for the Bleacher Report, ClickHole, The New Yorker, and Jon Stewart's aborted HBO animated series.

Raised in Branchburg, New Jersey, O'Hare attended Somerville High School.

His short humor piece for The New Yorker, "What I Assume Honore de Balzac Thought After Drinking Each of His Fifty Daily Cups of Coffee" was adapted into a short film for the Amazon series The New Yorker Presents. The film was titled Le Café de Balzac. It stars Paul Giamatti as Balzac, and was directed by Shari Springer Berman and Robert Pulcini.

O'Hare has developed a cult following on Twitter, and has received acclaim for his absurdist quips and flights of fancy.

In October 2026 it was announced that O'hare had written a script titled The Family Disappears. It is set to be directed by Jonatan Etzler and star David Harbour and John Cena and is described as a comedy "with thriller undertones."
