= Neshanic Mills =

- U.S. National Register of Historic Places
- U.S. Historic district
- New Jersey Register of Historic Places
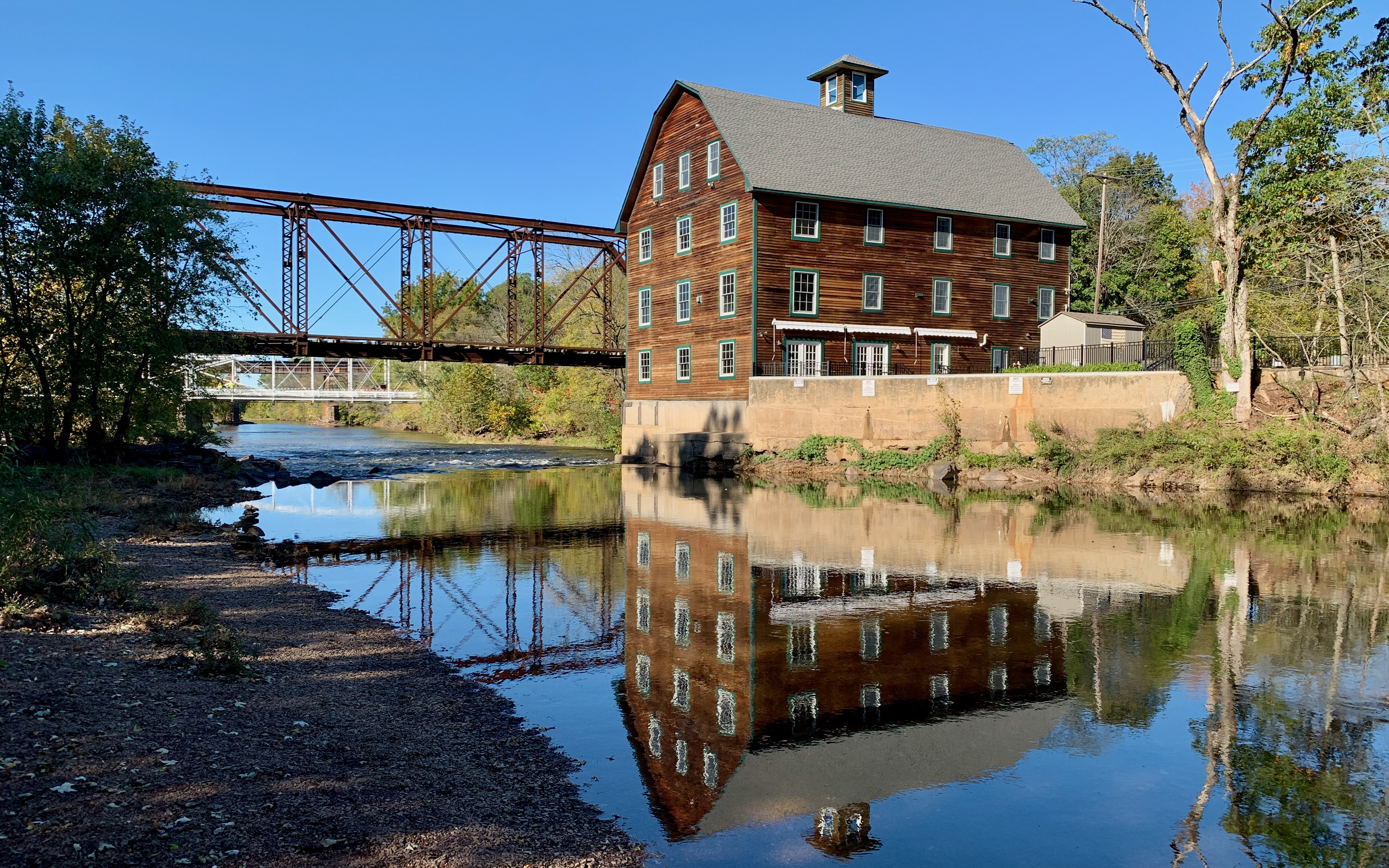
- Lane Grist Mill on the South Branch Raritan River

- Location within Somerset County, New Jersey Location within New Jersey Location within the United States
- Location: River Road and Mill Lane, Neshanic Station, New Jersey
- Coordinates: 40°30′31″N 74°43′33″W
- Area: 5 acres (2.0 ha)
- NRHP reference No.: 78001797
- NJRHP No.: 2524

Significant dates
- Added to NRHP: January 9, 1978
- Designated NJRHP: June 13, 1977

Neshanic Mills is a 5-acre (2.0 ha) historic district on the South Branch Raritan River along River Road and Mill Lane at Neshanic Station in Somerset County, New Jersey, United States. The district was added to the National Register of Historic Places on January 9, 1978, for its significance in engineering, industry, transportation, and settlement. It includes 4 contributing buildings and 2 contributing structures.

== History and description ==
The three-story Lane Grist Mill was constructed in 1876 by Andrew Lane. The Neshanic Station Lenticular Truss Bridge was constructed by the Berlin Iron Bridge Co. in 1896. The Central Railroad of New Jersey bridge was built around 1900.

== Gallery of contributing properties ==
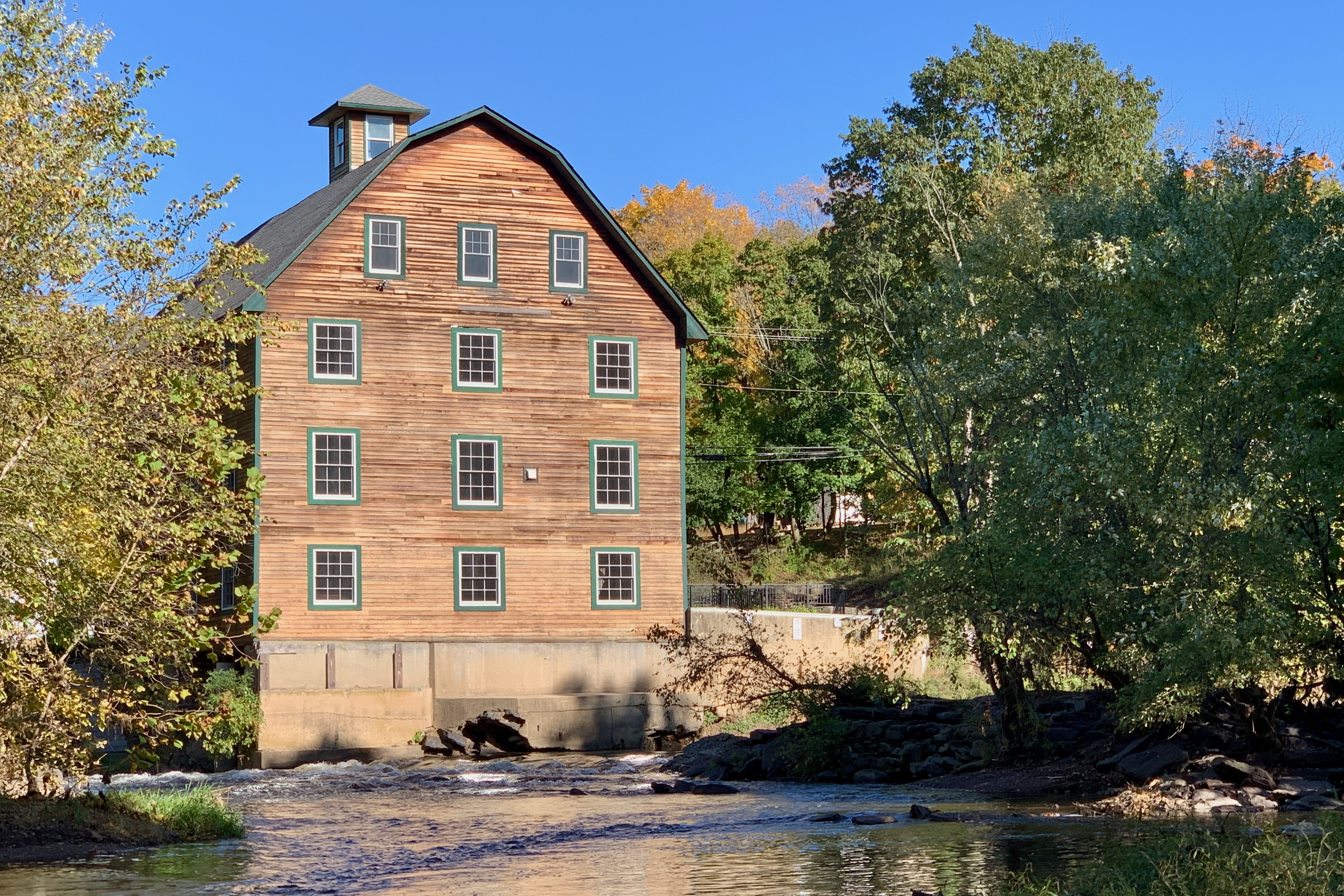
Lane Grist Mill

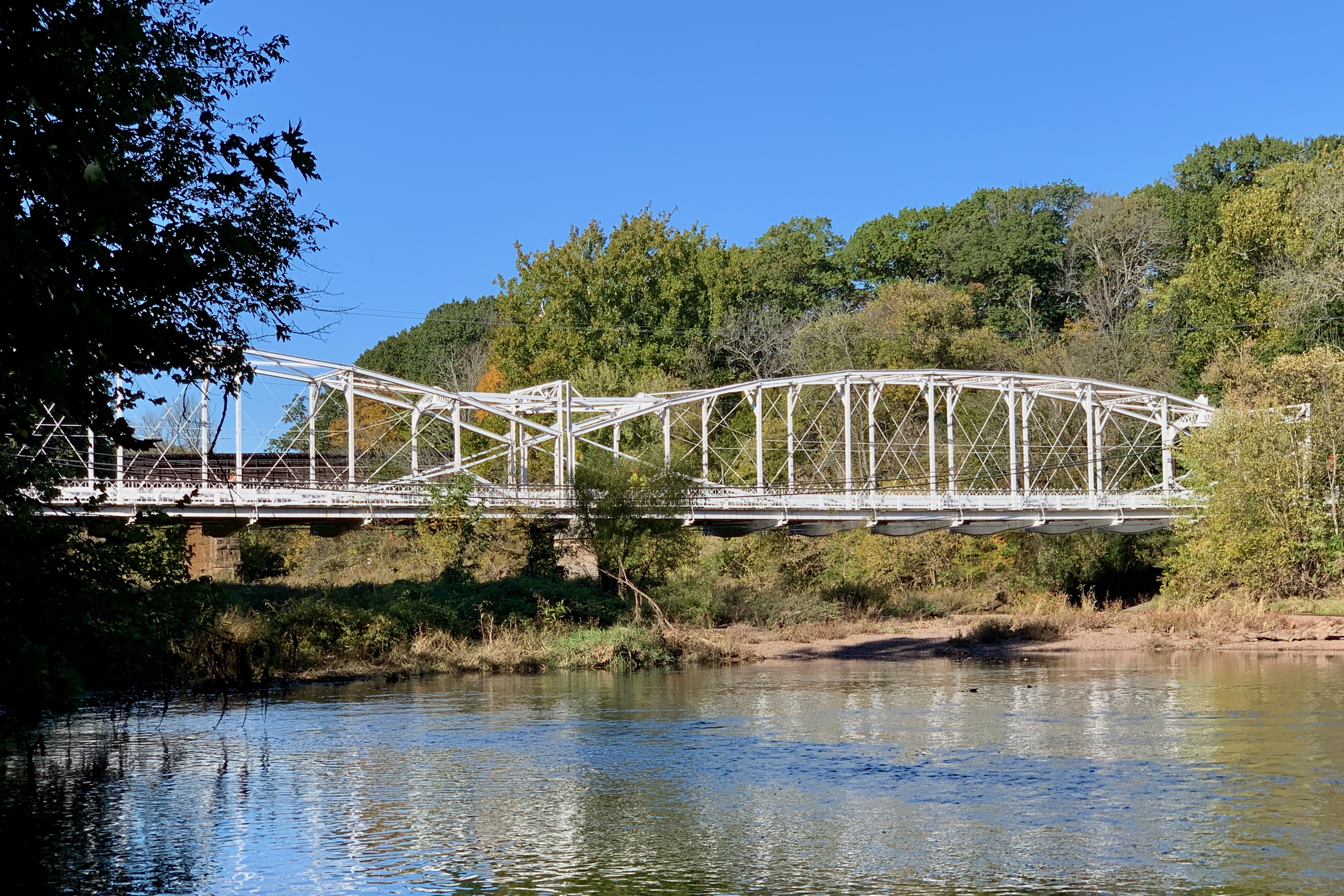
Neshanic Station Lenticular Truss Bridge

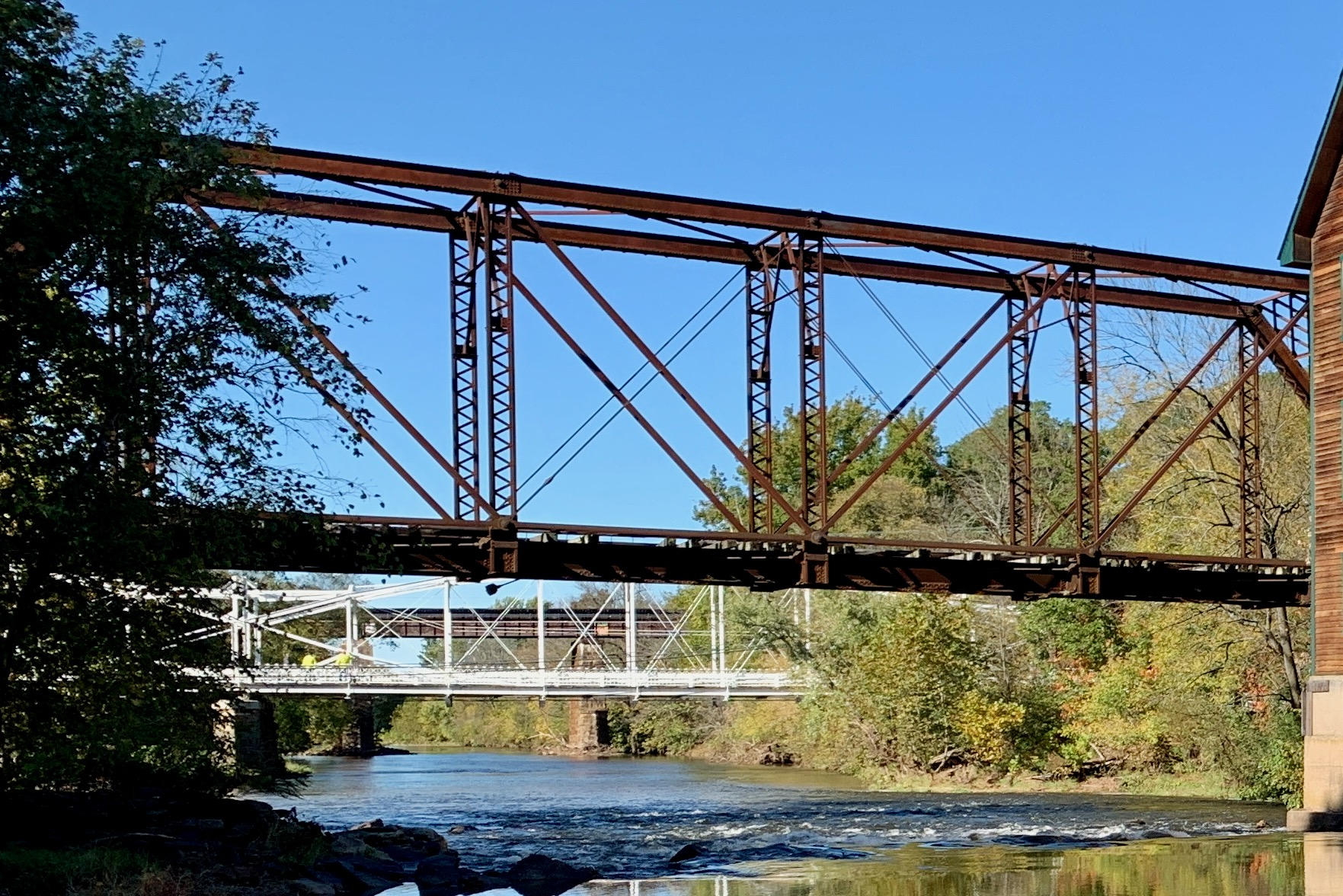
Abandoned railroad bridge, Through Pratt Truss
