= Neshanic Station Lenticular Truss Bridge =

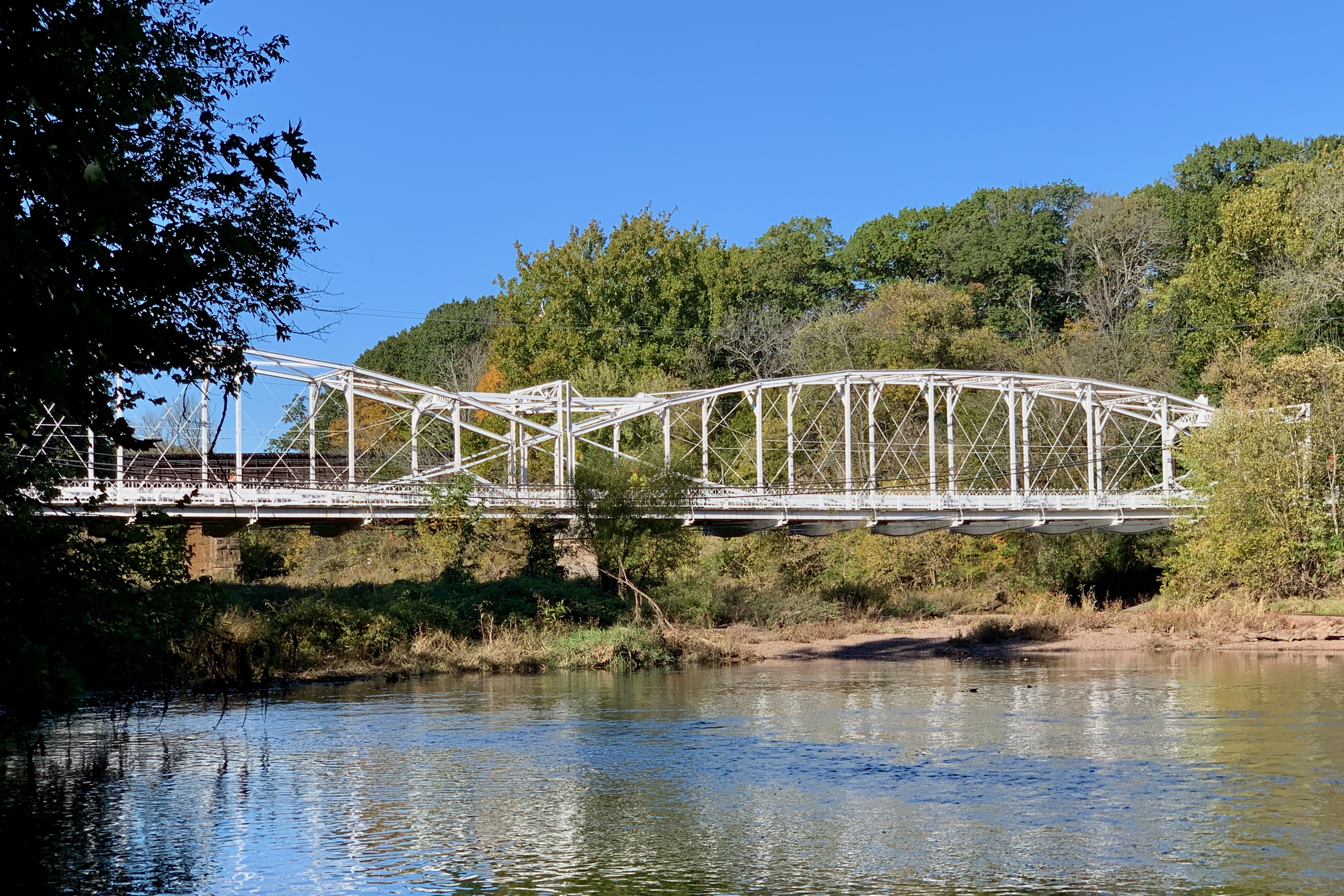
- Neshanic Station Lenticular Truss Bridge in 2020
- Coordinates: 40°30′34″N 74°43′37″W
- Crosses: South Branch Raritan River
- Locale: Neshanic Station, New Jersey
- Other name: Elm Street Bridge

Characteristics
- Design: Lenticular truss bridge
- Neshanic Station Lenticular Truss Bridge
- U.S. Historic district – Contributing property
- Part of: Neshanic Station Historic District (ID15001051)
- Added to NRHP: February 8, 2016

Location
- Interactive map of Neshanic Station Lenticular Truss Bridge

The Neshanic Station Lenticular Truss Bridge is a road bridge built over the South Branch Raritan River at Neshanic Station, New Jersey. It was constructed by the Berlin Iron Bridge Co. in 1896. and listed on the National Register of Historic Places as a contributing structure to the Neshanic Station Historic District on February 8, 2016.

== Gallery ==
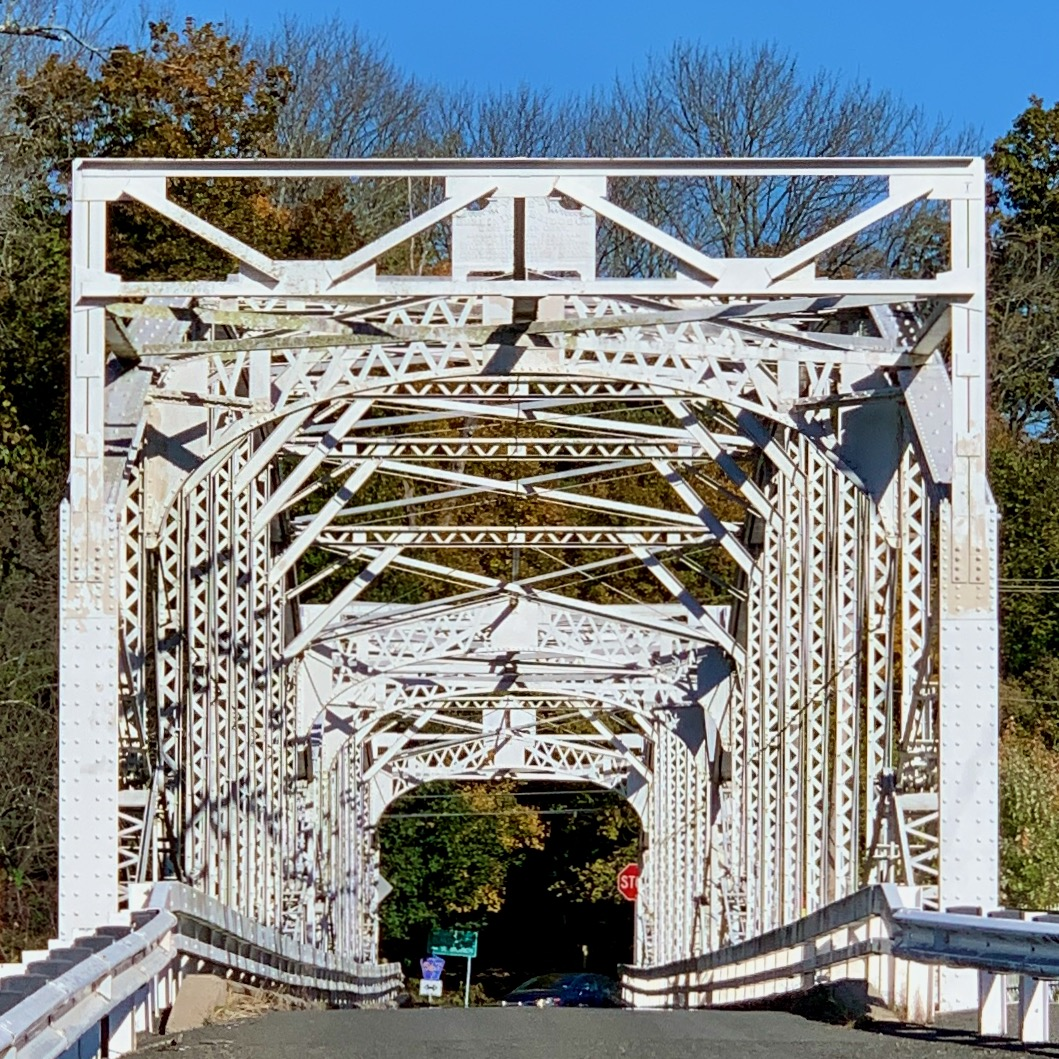
End view

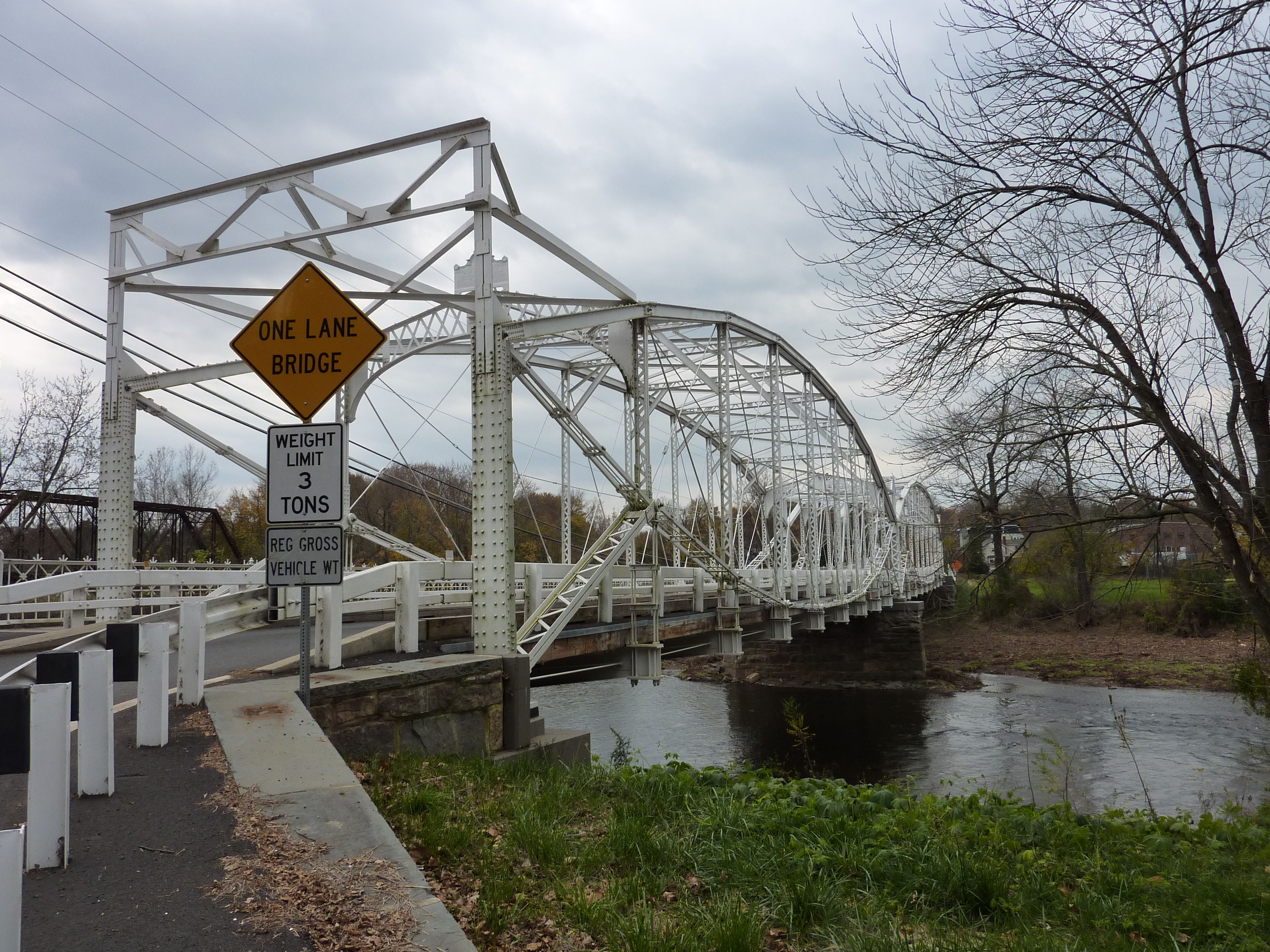
Looking east over the river

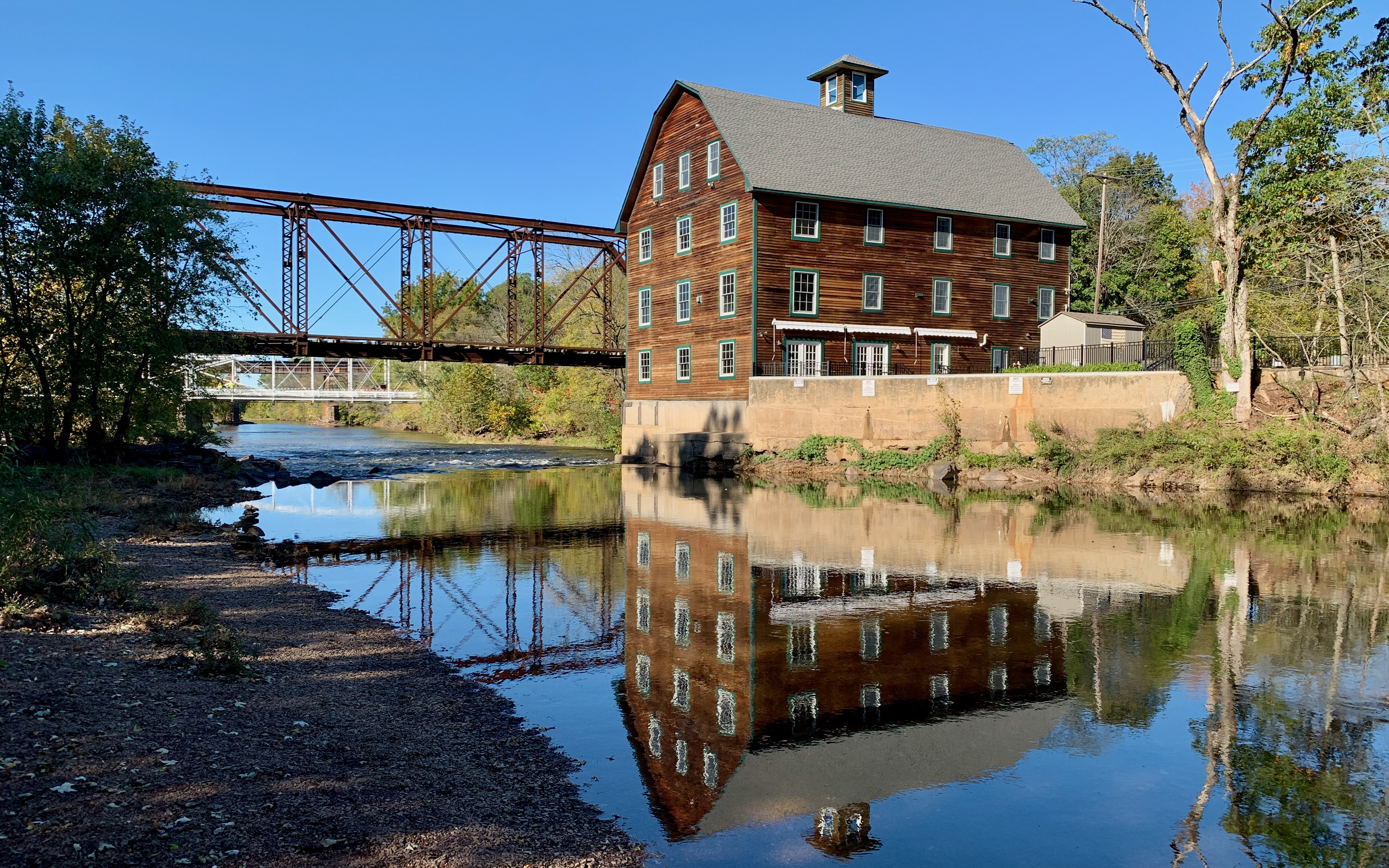
View from Neshanic Mills

== See also ==
- List of bridges documented by the Historic American Engineering Record in New Jersey
- List of bridges on the National Register of Historic Places in New Jersey
- List of crossings of the Raritan River
