= Neshanic Station, New Jersey =

Place in Somerset County, New Jersey, United States

- Census-designated place
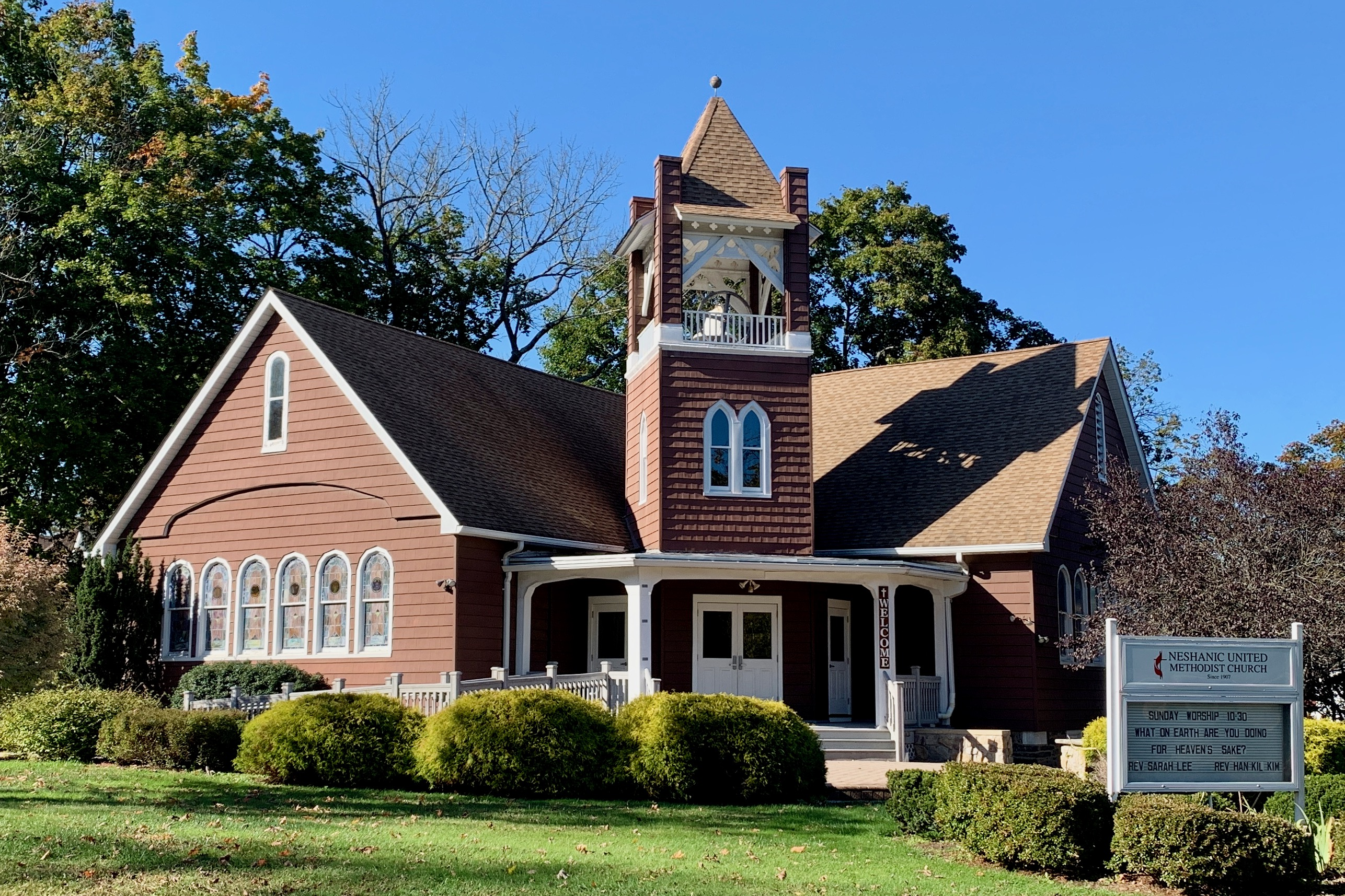
- Neshanic United Methodist Church

- Location in Somerset County Location in New Jersey Location in the United States
- Coordinates: 40°30′29″N 74°43′49″W
- Country: United States
- State: New Jersey
- Counties: Somerset, Hunterdon
- Townships: Branchburg, Readington

Area
  - Total: 9.50 sq mi (24.60 km^{2})
  - Land: 9.38 sq mi (24.29 km^{2})
  - Water: 0.12 sq mi (0.31 km^{2})

Population (2020)
  - Total: 5,224
  - Density: 557.1/sq mi (215.08/km^{2})
- Time zone: UTC−05:00 (Eastern (EST))
  - Summer (DST): UTC−04:00 (Eastern (EDT))
- FIPS code: 34-50100
- GNIS feature ID: 878715

Neshanic Station is an unincorporated community and census-designated place (CDP) located within Branchburg, Somerset County, and extending into Readington Township, Hunterdon County, in the U.S. state of New Jersey. As of the 2020 census, Neshanic Station had a population of 5,224. In 2016, most of the community was listed on the National Register of Historic Places as the Neshanic Station Historic District.

== Demographics ==
Historical population
Census	Pop.	Note	%±
2020	5,224		—
U.S. Decennial Census; 2020

Neshanic Station was first listed as a census designated place in the 2020 U.S. census.

=== 2020 census ===
As of the 2020 census, Neshanic Station had a population of 5,224. The median age was 45.5 years. 20.6% of residents were under the age of 18 and 17.6% of residents were 65 years of age or older. For every 100 females there were 94.9 males, and for every 100 females age 18 and over there were 89.9 males age 18 and over.

52.0% of residents lived in urban areas, while 48.0% lived in rural areas.

There were 1,917 households in Neshanic Station, of which 33.1% had children under the age of 18 living in them. Of all households, 63.3% were married-couple households, 12.3% were households with a male householder and no spouse or partner present, and 19.8% were households with a female householder and no spouse or partner present. About 18.2% of all households were made up of individuals and 9.6% had someone living alone who was 65 years of age or older.

There were 1,965 housing units, of which 2.4% were vacant. The homeowner vacancy rate was 1.2% and the rental vacancy rate was 4.5%.

Neshanic Station CDP, New Jersey – Racial and ethnic composition Note: the US Census treats Hispanic/Latino as an ethnic category. This table excludes Latinos from the racial categories and assigns them to a separate category. Hispanics/Latinos may be of any race.
Race / Ethnicity (NH = Non-Hispanic)	Pop 2020	2020
White alone (NH)	3,853	73.76%
Black or African American alone (NH)	185	3.54%
Native American or Alaska Native alone (NH)	2	0.04%
Asian alone (NH)	645	12.35%
Native Hawaiian or Pacific Islander alone (NH)	0	0.00%
Other race alone (NH)	7	0.13%
Mixed race or Multiracial (NH)	179	3.43%
Hispanic or Latino (any race)	353	6.76%
Total	5,224	100.00%

== History ==
Neshanic Station comes from the Algonquian language meaning "double stream," and the community featured a station along the defunct South Branch Railroad, later a branch of the Central Railroad of New Jersey. The Lehigh Line of Norfolk Southern Railway (formerly the Lehigh Valley Railroad) still runs on tracks north of the community. Neshanic Station is situated at a latitude of 40.508N and a longitude of -74.73W. It is in the Eastern Standard Time Zone with an elevation of 92 feet.

The South Branch Raritan River passes east of the community. The Elm Street Bridge is a lenticular truss bridge that carries Elm Street (Somerset County Route 667) over the river out of the community to River Road (CR 567).

== Historic district ==
- Neshanic Station Historic District
- U.S. National Register of Historic Places
- U.S. Historic district
- New Jersey Register of Historic Places
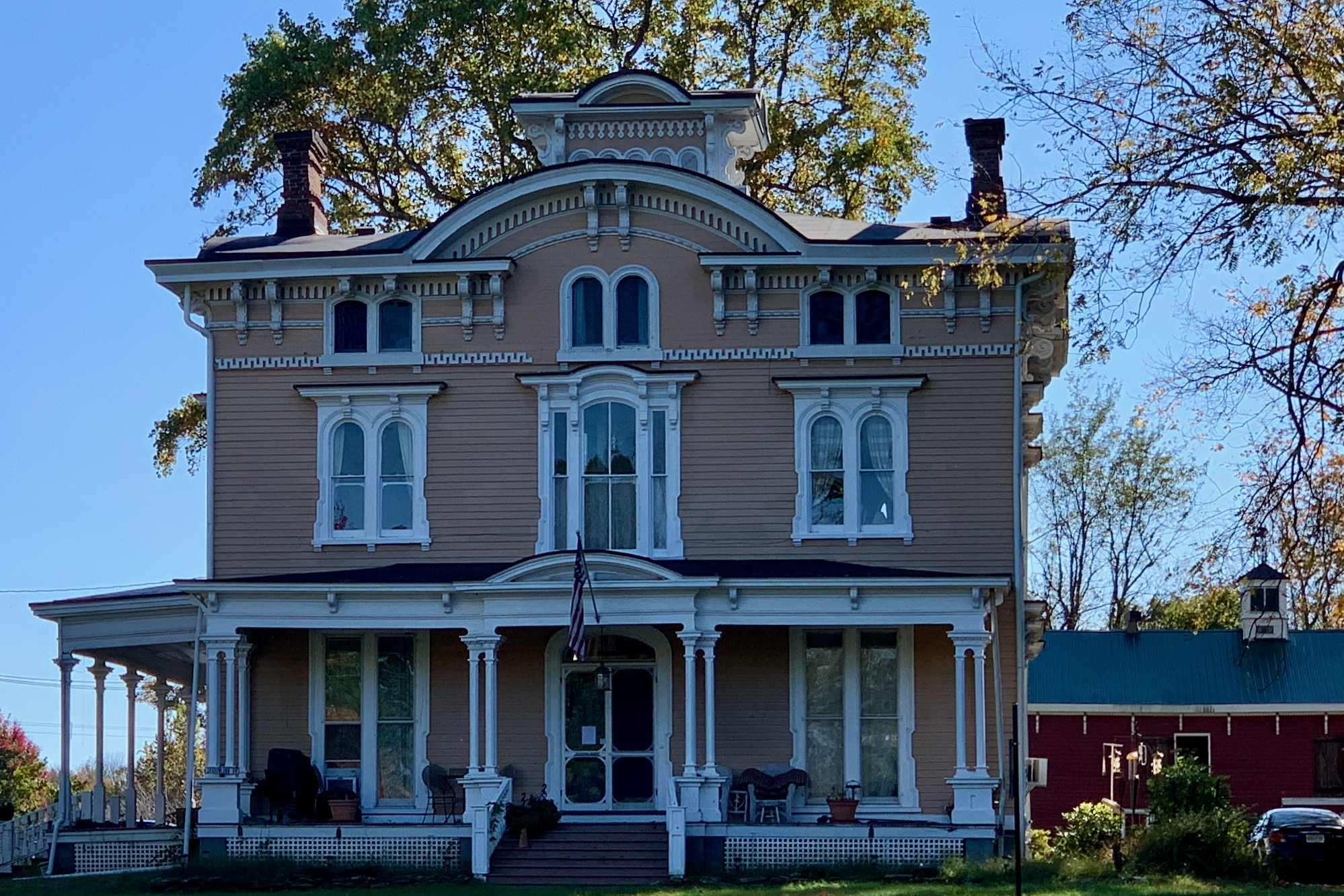
- John G. Schenck House, "Shadow Lawn"
- Location: Maple Avenue, Fairview Drive; Elm, Olive, Pearl, Main, Marshall Streets; Woodfern Road
- Area: 112 acres (45 ha)
- Architectural style: Italianate, Gothic Revival, Queen Anne
- NRHP reference No.: 15001051
- NJRHP No.: 2903

Significant dates
- Added to NRHP: February 8, 2016
- Designated NJRHP: December 17, 2015

The Neshanic Station Historic District is a historic district encompassing the village. The district was added to the National Register of Historic Places on February 8, 2016 for its significance in community development from 1857 to 1940. It includes 94 contributing buildings and 5 contributing structures.

== Gallery ==
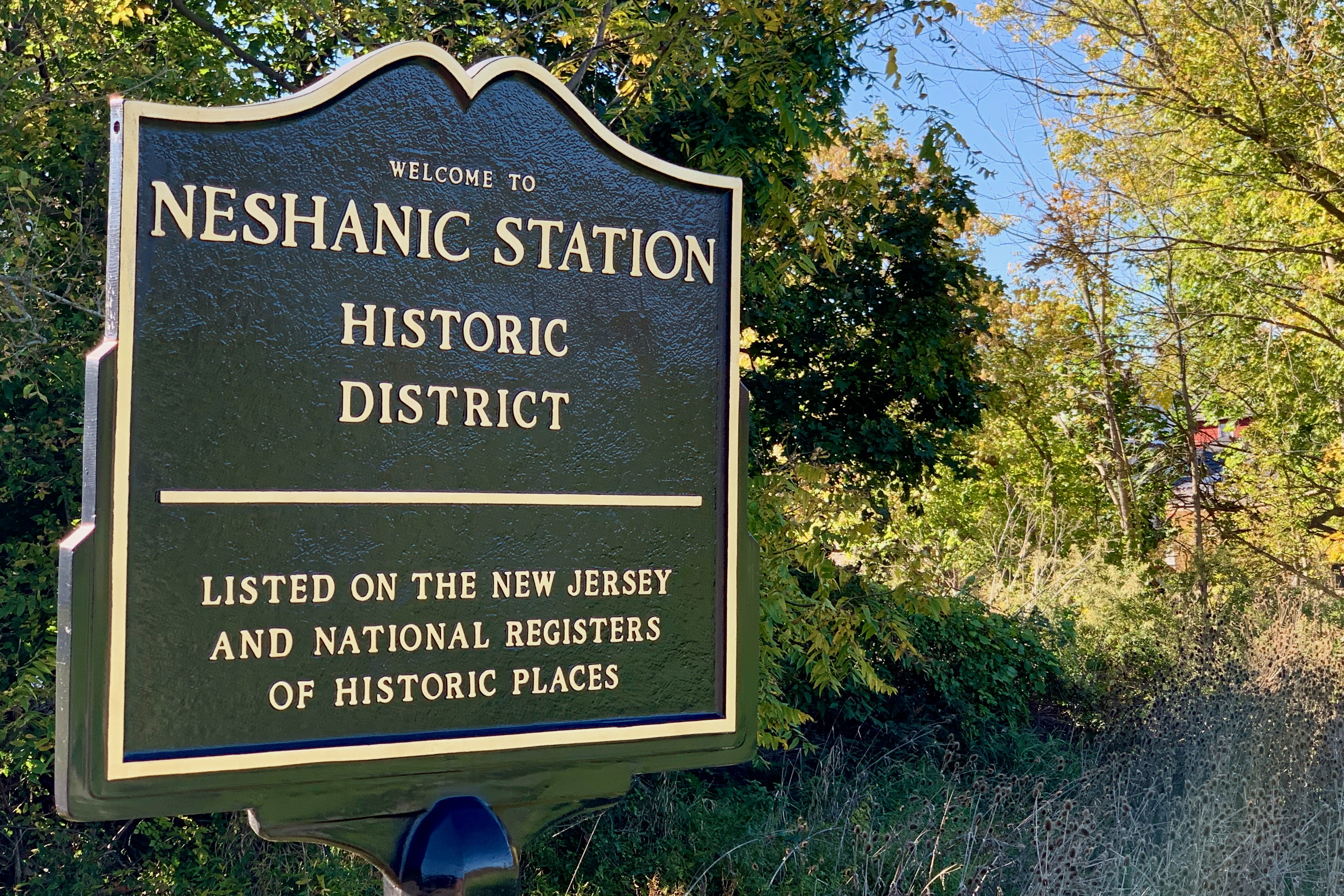
District information sign

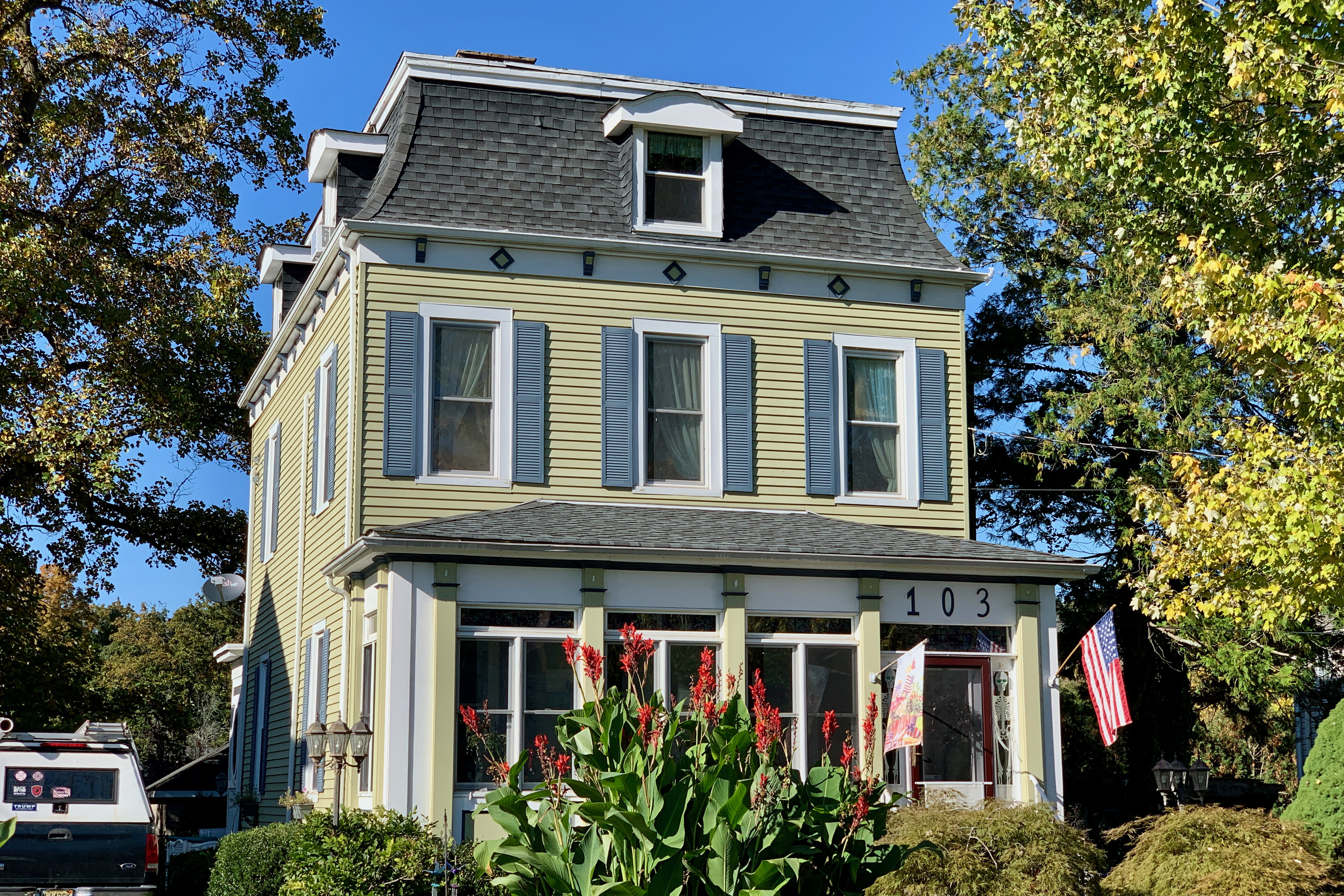
Second Empire style

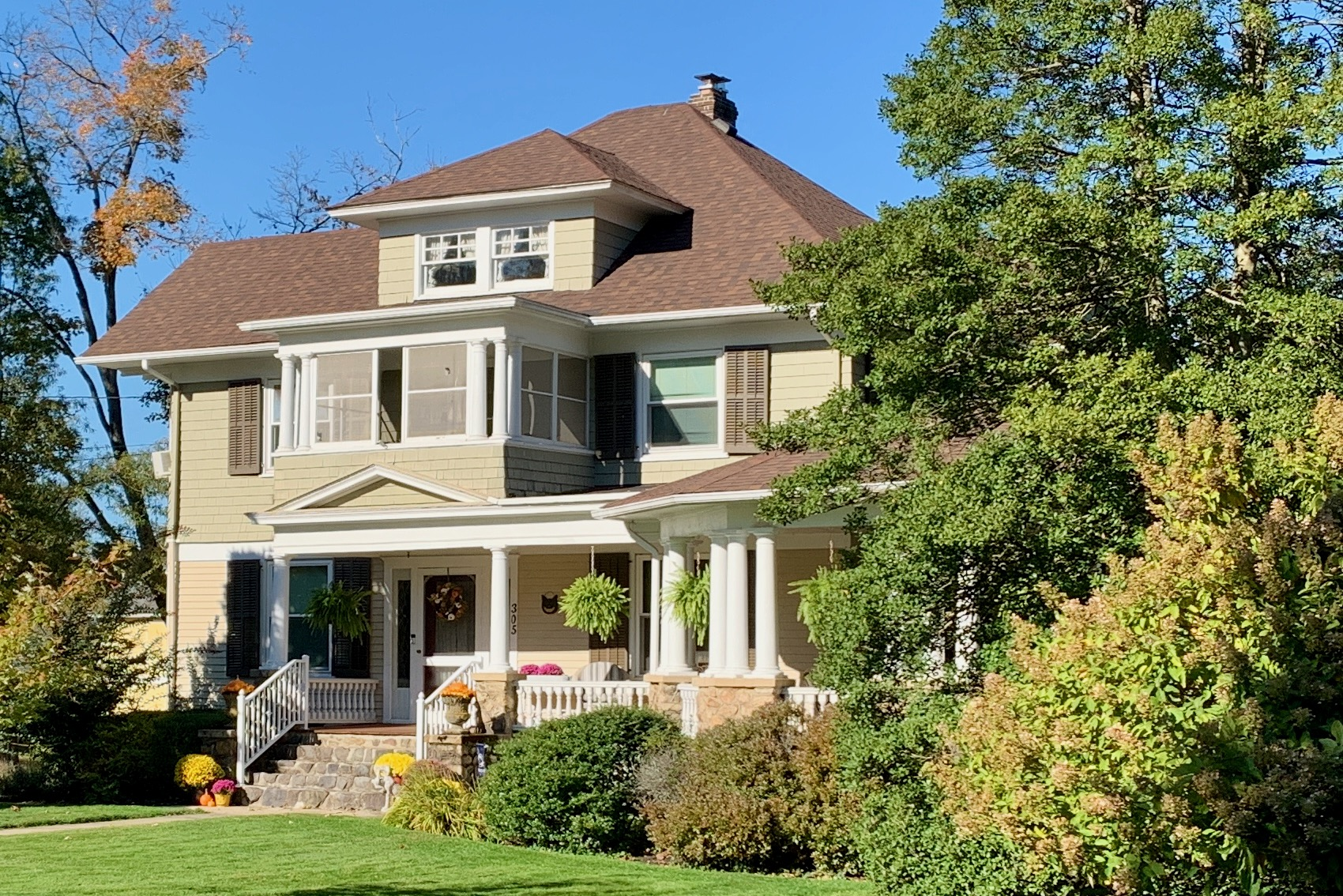
Colonial Revival style

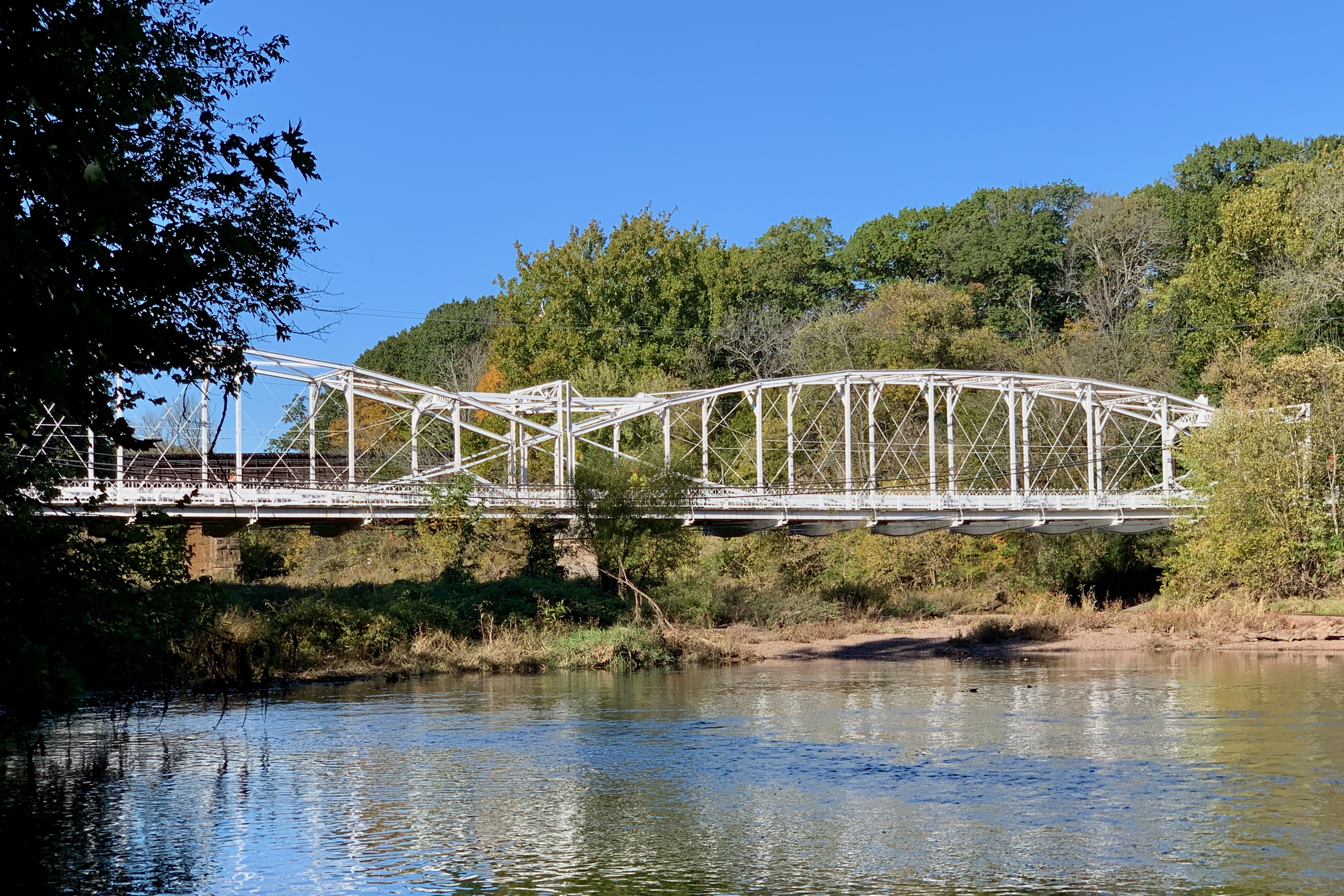
Neshanic Station Lenticular Truss Bridge

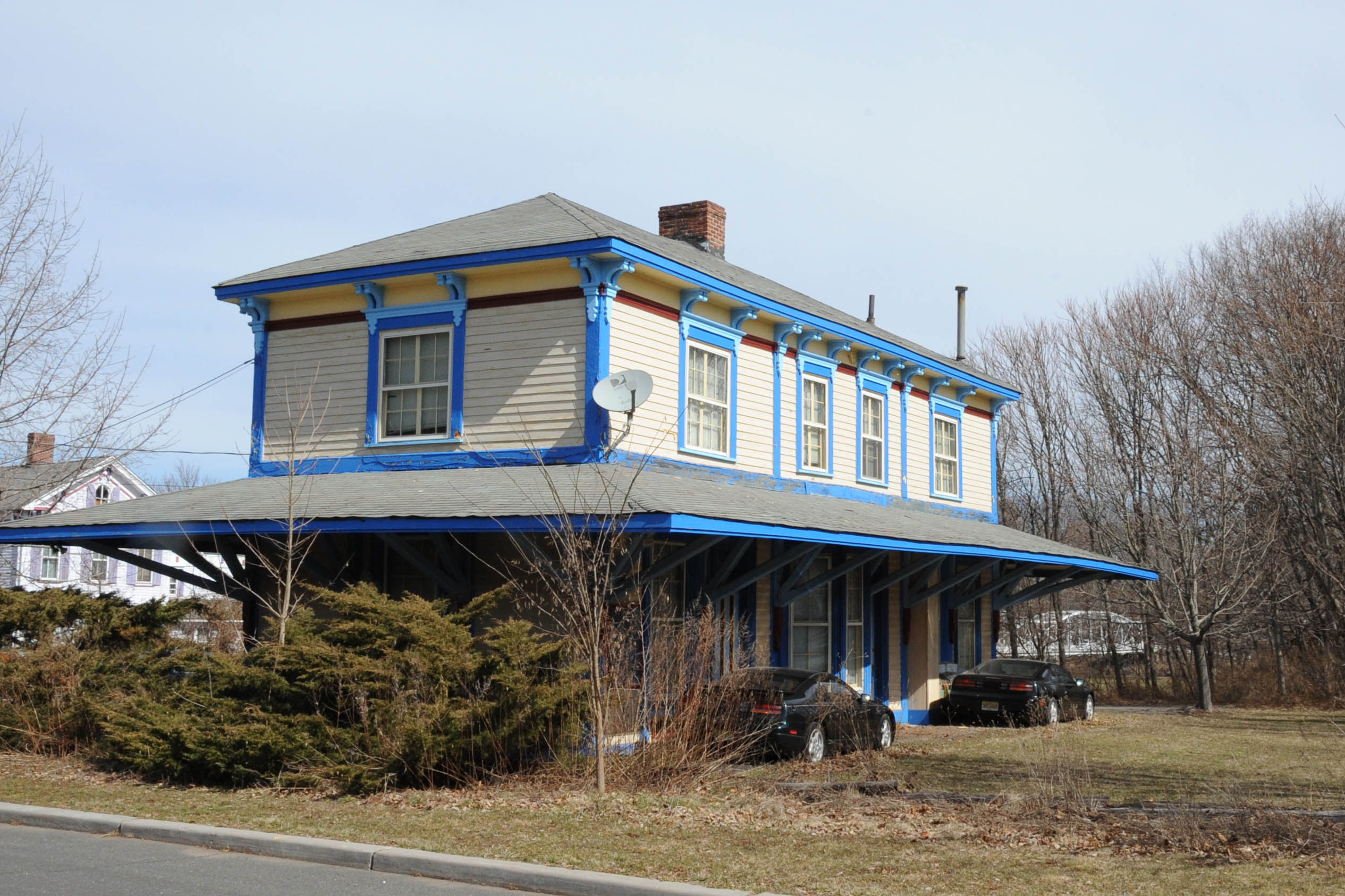
Old Station Building

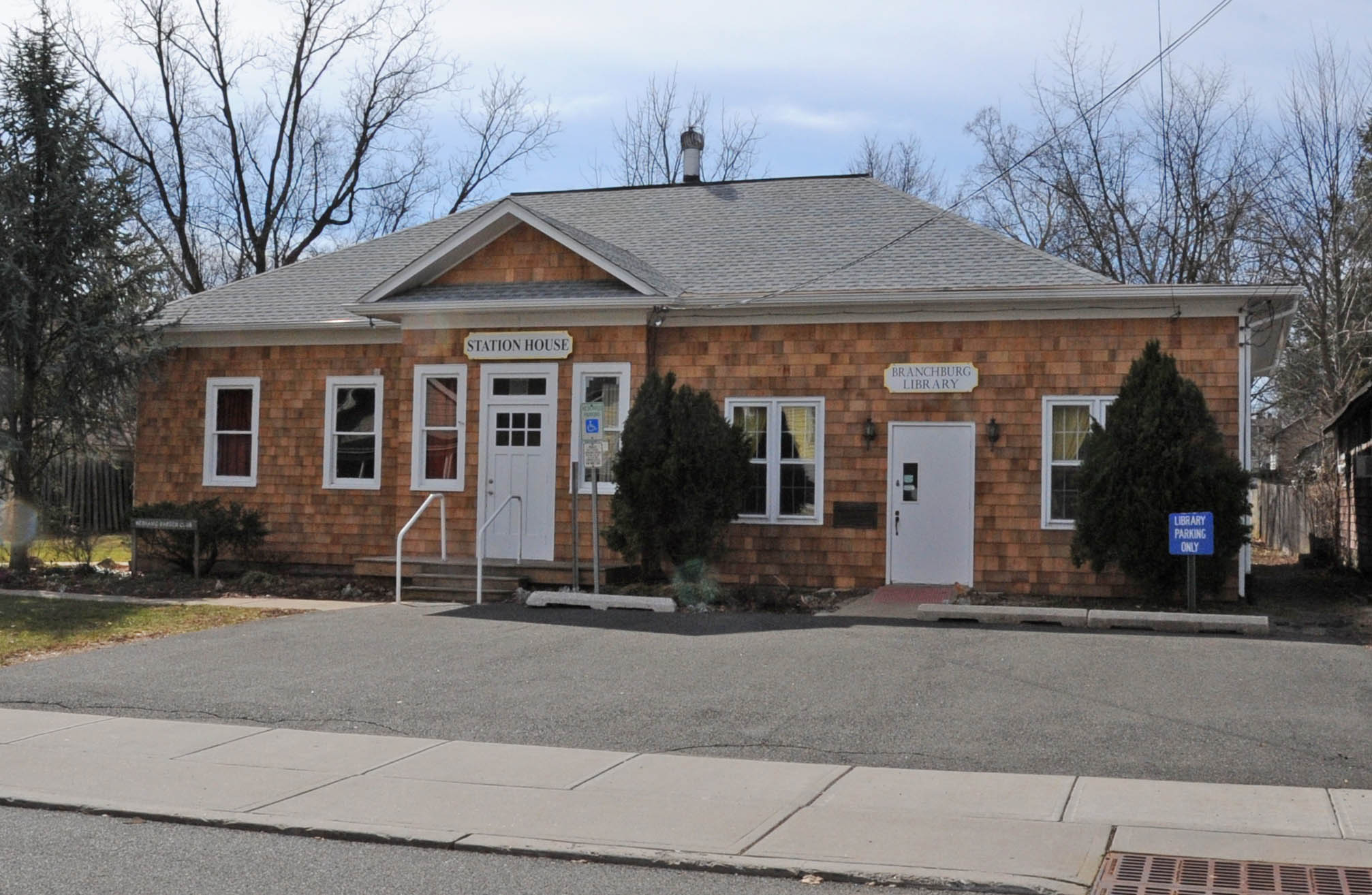
Library and former firestation

== Points of interest ==
Neshanic Mills, also listed on the NRHP, is one of the last remaining grist mills along the South Branch Raritan River.

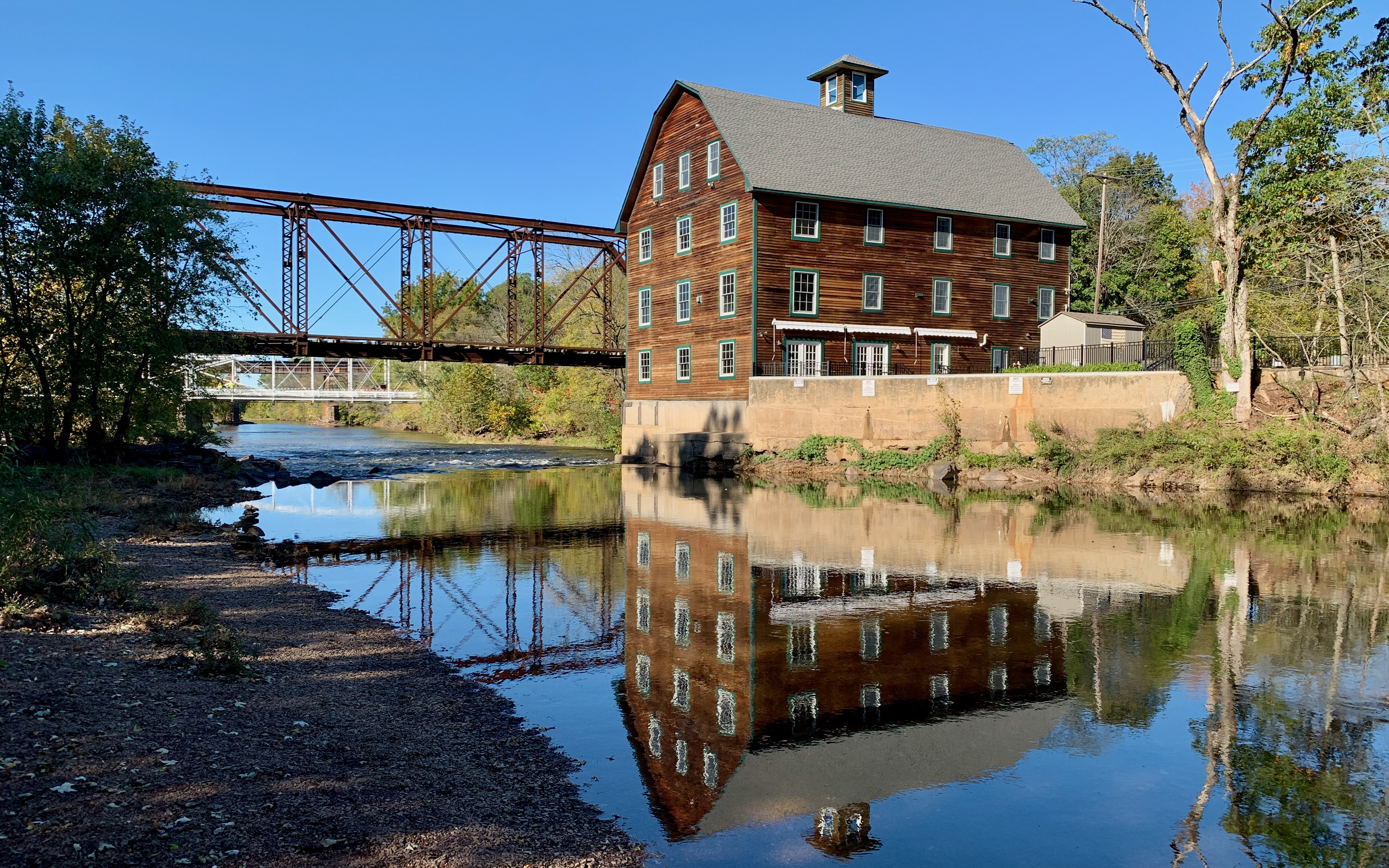
Neshanic Mills at Neshanic Station

== Notable people ==
People who were born in, residents of, or otherwise closely associated with Neshanic Station include:

- Frank Chapot (1932–2016), Olympic silver medalist equestrian.
- Anthony Gargiulo (born 1984). defensive end who played in the Canadian Football League for the Calgary Stampeders.

== See also ==
- Neshanic, New Jersey
