= Jasmine Brown =

U.S. author and medical student

- Education: Washington University (BA); Hertford College, Oxford (MPhil); University of Pennsylvania
- Website: Official website

Jasmine Brown is an American author and medical student. She is the author of the 2023 book, Twice as Hard: The Stories of Black Women Who Fought to Become Physicians, from the Civil War to the 21st Century.

== Life ==
Brown lived in Indiana during her childhood and she frequently visited extended family members in St. Louis, Missouri. In 2014, Brown graduated from Hillsborough High School in Hillsborough Township, New Jersey. She was a member of its track and field, the National Honor Society, and the Sociedad Honoraria Hispánica.

Brown attended Arts and Sciences at Washington University in St. Louis as an Ervin and Rodriguez Scholar. She majored in biology with a focus in neuroscience. Brown founded and served as president of the Minority Association of Rising Scientists.

She was a research assistant at a few institutions including the Broad Institute where conducted researched cancer, Johns Hopkins University, where she conducted pulmonary research, and the Miller School of Medicine at the University of Miami, where she conducted behavioral research. In the spring of 2018, she was investigating the molecular pathways of the West Nile and Zika viruses. She was a member of the Alpha Kappa Alpha. Brown graduated with a B.A. in 2018.

In late 2017, Brown won a Rhodes Scholarship. In January 2018, the township committee of Hillsborough Township honored Brown with a proclamation for her Rhodes selection. In 2020, Brown earned a MPhil in the history of science, medicine, and technology from the Hertford College, Oxford. She researched the impacts of Black women physicians in medicine and American society.

In 2020, Brown enrolled at the Perelman School of Medicine at the University of Pennsylvania. In January 2023, during her third year of medical school, she authored a book based on her earlier research on Black women in medicine. In it, Brown profiles nine physicians including Rebecca Lee Crumpler, May Edward Chinn, and Marilyn Gaston.

During her time in medical school, Brown worked under Dr. Eve Higginbotham and Dr. Ahmara Ross. Their research together led Brown to become intrigued by ophthalmology. Now, Brown is a class of 2029 resident in Standford Medicine's ophthalmology program.

== Selected works ==
- Brown, Jasmine (2023). Twice as Hard: The Stories of Black Women Who Fought to Become Physicians, from the Civil War to the 21st Century. Beacon Press. ISBN 978-0-8070-2508-6.
