= Paul Michael Lützeler =

German-American scholar

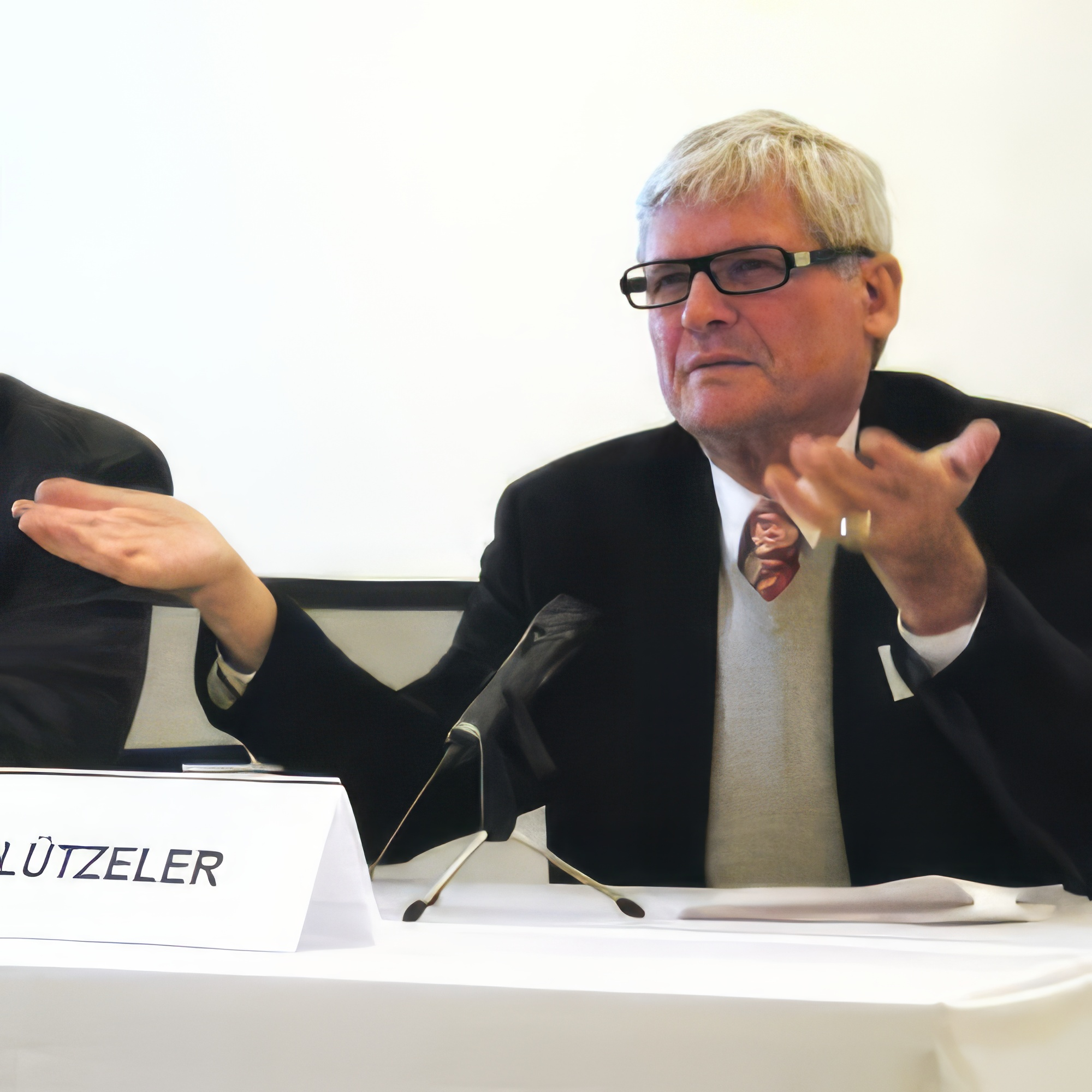
Paul Michael Lützeler (Vienna 2011)

Paul Michael Lützeler (born November 4, 1943, in Doveren, Heinsberg, Germany) is a German-American scholar of German studies and comparative literature. He is the Rosa May Distinguished University Professor Emeritus in the Humanities at Washington University in St. Louis.

== Life ==
Lutzeler studied German and English Literature, Philosophy and History in Berlin, Edinburgh, Vienna and Munich. In 1968 he emigrated to the United States and in 1972 he defended his dissertation at Indiana University Bloomington. In 1973 he moved to St. Louis, where he became a professor at Washington University in St. Louis. He was Chair of the Washington University Faculty Senate Council from 1993 to 1995. In 1983 he founded the European Studies Program in Arts and Sciences at Washington University in St. Louis, of which he was in charge for 20 years. In 1985 he founded the Max Kade Center for Contemporary German Literature, which he chaired until 2022. He chaired the German department from 1983 to 1988. From 1985 until 2022 he was inviting an author and a critic from one of the German-speaking countries every year to St. Louis for teaching and researching. In 2002 he founded Gegenwartsliteratur. A German Studies Yearbook of which he was the Editor in Chief until 2020. Lutzeler was also engaged in exchange programs between Washington University and different European, American and Asian universities. From 2010 to 2019 he worked on the committee of the transatlantic postdoc exchange funded by the Volkswagen Foundation. He was guest professor in Princeton University, Tübingen, Graz, Mainz, Greifswald, Freiburg, New Delhi, Beijing, Madrid, and Tokyo among others. He taught block seminars at universities in Melbourne, Pavia, Guadalajara, Jerusalem and Zadar.

Lutzeler is president of the IAB (Internationaler Arbeitskreis Hermann Broch), president of the AFM (American Friends of the German Literary Archives in Marbach am Neckar from 2012 to 2019 and was from 2005 to 2010 vice-president of Internationale Vereinigung für Germanistik. He is a corresponding member of two academies in Germany: Akademie der Wissenschaften und der Literatur Mainz, and the North Rhine-Westphalian Academy of Sciences, Humanities and the Arts and also a member of the Academia Europaea. He was a member of the strategy commission of the Wissenschaftsrat der Bundesrepublik Deutschland from 2011 to 2016, and he is a member of the PEN Centre Germany. Since 2015, he has also been a member of the executive committee of Gesellschaft für interkulturelle Germanistik. Lutzeler is a German and American citizen and lives in St. Louis. He is married and has two children.

== Work ==
Lutzeler's main research interests are contemporary German literature, the literary discourse about Europe, German speaking Exile-Literature in the U.S., and German and European Romanticism. Lutzeler is an expert for the Austro-American exile-author Hermann Broch, whose works he edited and whose biography he has written. He also published essays and books about the discourses of postmodernism, postcolonialism, continentalization, and globalization. Several of his works were translated into foreign languages. He also wrote for German newspapers and magazines like Die Zeit, the Neue Zürcher Zeitung, Der Tagesspiegel, Die Welt, Frankfurter Rundschau, the Neue Rundschau and the Merkur.

== Awards ==
- The DAAD Prize of the German Studies Association for the Broch biography
- South West Broadcasting (Südwestrundfunk) List of Best Books for the Broch edition Der Tod im Exil
- Austrian Decoration for Science and Art
- Officer's Cross of the Order of Merit of the Federal Republic of Germany
- Grand Decoration of Honour for Services to the Republic of Austria
- Goethe Medal of the Goethe Institute
- Outstanding Educator Award of the American Association of Teachers of German
- Honorary Membership of the American Association of Teachers of German
- Outstanding Faculty Mentor Award of Washington University in St. Louis
- Research Award of Alexander von Humboldt Foundation
- The Arthur Holly Compton Faculty Achievement Award of Washington University in St. Louis
- Award for International Exchange of the DAAD Alumni Association USA
- Friedrich-Gundolf-Preis of the German Academy for Language and Literature
- Dr. h.c. (Doctor of Humanities) from Washington University in St. Louis

== Grants ==
- Fulbright Foundation
- Woodrow Wilson Foundation
- Deutscher Akademischer Austauschdienst
- American Council of Learned Societies
- John Simon Guggenheim Memorial Foundation
- Alexander von Humboldt Foundation (Research Award)
- Zentrum für interdisziplinaere Forschungen, Bielefeld
- Akademie Schloss Solitude, Stuttgart
- Humanities Research Center, Canberra
- Indiana Institute for Advanced Study, Bloomington
- Alfried Krupp Wissenschaftskolleg, Greifswald
- Berlin Kolleg für vergleichende Geschichte Europas
- Freiburg Institute for Advanced Studies
- Internationales Kolleg Morphomata (Institute for Advanced Studies) der Universität zu Köln
- Internationales Forschungszentrum Kulturwissenschaften (IFK) Wien
- Kulturwissenschaftliches Institut (KWI), Essen

== Bibliography ==
=== Books (selection) ===
- Hermann Broch: Eine Biographie. Suhrkamp Verlag, Frankfurt am Main 1985. (translated into English, Spanish and Japanese, also as an eBook)
- Geschichte in der Literatur. Studien zu Werken von Lessing bis Hebbel. Piper, München 1987.
- Die Schriftsteller und Europa. Von der Romantik bis zur Gegenwart. Piper, München 1992.
- Europäische Identität und Multikultur". Stauffenburg, Tübingen 1997. (translated into Italian)
- Kulturbruch und Glaubenskrise: Brochs 'Schlafwandler' und Grünewalds 'Isenheimer Altar'. Tübingen: Francke, 2001.
- Postmoderne und postkoloniale deutschsprachige Literatur. Aisthesis, Bielefeld 2005.
- Kontinentalisierung: Das Europa der Schriftsteller. Aisthesis, Bielefeld 2007.
- Bürgerkrieg global. Menschenrechtsethos und deutschsprachiger Gegenwartsroman. Wilhelm Fink Verlag, München 2009.
- Hermann Broch und die Moderne. Wilhelm Fink, München 2011
- Transatlantische Germanistik: Kontakt, Transfer, Dialogik. De Gruyter, Berlin 2013.
- Publizistische Germanistik. Essays und Kritiken. De Gruyter, Berlin 2015.
- Hermann Broch und die Menschenrechte: Anti-Versklavung als Ethos der Welt. De Gruyter, Berlin 2021.

=== Editions (selection) ===
- Hermann Broch. Kommentierte Werkausgabe, 17 Bände. Suhrkamp, Frankfurt am Main 1974–1981. (also as an ebook)
- Deutsche Literatur in der Bundesrepublik seit 1965 (with Egon Schwarz). Athenäum, Königstein 1980
- Romane und Erzählungen der deutschen Romantik. Neue Interpretationen. Reclam, Stuttgart 1981.
- Goethes Erzählwerk. Interpretationen (with James E. McLeod). Reclam, Stuttgart 1985.
- Zeitgenossenschaft. Festschrift für Egon Schwarz zum 65. Geburtstag. with Herbert Lehnert and Gerhild S. Williams. Frankfurt am Main: Athenäum, 1987.
- Spätmoderne und Postmoderne. Beiträge zur deutschsprachigen Gegenwartsliteratur. Fischer Taschenbuch Verlag, Frankfurt am Main 1991.
- Hoffnung Europa. Deutsche Essays von Novalis bis Enzensberger. S. Fischer, Frankfurt am Main 1994.
- Europe after Maastricht. American and European Perspectives. Berghahn Books, Providence, Oxford 1994. (also translated into Rumanian)
- Poetik der Autoren. Beiträge zur deutschsprachigen Gegenwartsliteratur. Fischer Taschenbuch Verlag, Frankfurt am Main 1994.
- Hannah Arendt-Hermann Broch. Briefwechsel 1946–1951. Jüdischer Verlag im Suhrkamp Verlag, Frankfurt am Main 1996.
- Schreiben zwischen den Kulturen. Beiträge zur deutschsprachigen Gegenwartsliteratur. Fischer Taschenbuch Verlag, Frankfurt am Main 1996. (translated into English)
- Der postkoloniale Blick. Deutsche Autoren berichten aus der Dritten Welt. Suhrkamp, Frankfurt am Main 1997.
- Räume der literarischen Postmoderne. Gender, Performativität, Globalisierung. Stauffenburg, Tübingen 2000.
- Kleists Erzählungen und Dramen. Neue Studien (with David Pan). Königshausen & Neumann, Würzburg 2001.
- Hermann Broch. Visionary in Exile. The 2001 Yale Symposium (with Matthias Konzett, Willy Riemer and Christa Sammmons). Camden House, Rochester, New York 2003.
- Freundschaft im Exil. Thomas Mann und Hermann Broch. Klostermann Verlag, Frankfurt am Main 2004.
- Hermann Broch und die Künste (with Alice Staskova), DeGruyter, Berlin 2009.
- Verlorener Sohn? Hermann Brochs Briefwechsel mit Armand. Suhrkamp, Frankfurt am Main 2010.
- Die Ethik der Literatur. Deutsche Autoren der Gegenwart (with Jennifer Kapczynski). Göttingen, Wallstein 2011.
- Hermann Broch und die Romantik (with Doren Wohlleben). Berlin und New York, De Gruyter 2014.
- Hermann Broch Handbuch. (with Michael Kessler): De Gruyter, Berlin und Boston 2016.
- Transatlantic German Studies: Testimonies to the Profession (with Peter Hoeyng). Camden House, Rochester NY 2018.
- Hermann Broch – Frank Thiess, Briefwechsel 1929 – 1938 | 1948 – 1951. Wallstein, Göttingen 2018.
- Aussteigen um 1900. Imaginationen in der Literatur der Moderne (with Barbara Mahlmann-Bauer). Wallstein, Goettingen 2021.
- Die Europäische Union zwischen Konfusion und Vision: Interdisziplinaere Fragestellungen (with Michael Gehler). Boehlau, Wien 2022.
- Hermann Broch und die österreichische Moderne (with Thomas Borgard). Brill/Fink 2023.

=== Editor of scholarly journals ===
- The German Quarterly (1988–1991)
- Gegenwartsliteratur. A German Studies Yearbook (2002–2020)

=== Editor of scholarly series ===
- Studies in Contemporary German Literature (1995–2005): 19 vol.
- Co-Ed.: Stauffenburg Discussion: Studies in Inter- and Multiculture (1995–2015): 29 vol.

=== Advisory board ===
- The German Quarterly (1992–1994, 1998–2003)
- Jahrbuch Deutsch als Fremdsprache (1986–1996)
- South Atlantic Review (1998–2001)
- Recherches Germaniques (since 2001)
- Literaturstrasse. Deutsch-Chinesisches Jahrbuch (since 2000)
- Comparative Literature Studies (since 2002)
- Moderne: Kulturwissenschaftliches Jahrbuch (2005–2011)
- Études Germaniques (since 2009)
- Revista de Filologia Alemana (since 2009)
- Palaestra (since 2010)
- Zeitschrift für Interkulturelle Germanistik (since 2010)
- Studia Theodisca (since 2011)

== Literature ==
- Michael Kessler et al. (ed.): Hermann Broch – Neue Studien. Festschrift für Paul Michael Lützeler zum 60. Geburtstag. Stauffenburg, Tübingen 2003 (with bibliography Paul Michael Luetzeler)
- Mark W. Rectanus (ed.): Über Gegenwartsliteratur/About Contemporary Literature. Festschrift für Paul Michael Lützeler zum 65. Geburtstag. Bielefeld, Aisthesis 2008 (with bibliography Paul Michael Luetzeler).
- Peter Hanenberg und Isabel Capeloa Gil (ed.): Der literarische Europa-Diskurs. Festschrift für Paul Michael Lützeler zum 70. Geburtstag. Würzburg: Königshausen & Neumann, 2013. (with bibliography Paul Michael Luetzeler).
- Michael Braun (ed.): Deutsche Literatur und Europäische Zeitgeschichte. Für Paul Michael Lützeler zum 75. Geburtstag. Stauffenburg, Tübingen 2018.
- Michael Kessler (ed.): Interkulturelle Dialoge. Exil- und Gegenwartsliteratur, Europa- und Kunst-Diskurse. Festschrift fuer Paul Michael Lützeler zum 80. Geburtstag. Tübingen: Stauffenburg, 2023. (with bibliography Paul Michael Lützeler)
