= Malko (disambiguation) =

Malko was a king of the Kingdom of Garo. Malko may also refer to:

- Nicolai Malko (1883–1961), Russian-born American composer
- Saimir Malko (born 1961), retired Albanian footballer
- Kristin Malko (born 1982), American actress
