= Hillsborough High School =

Hillsborough High School can refer to:

- Hillsborough High School (Florida) in Tampa, Florida
- Hillsborough High School (New Jersey) in Hillsborough, New Jersey
