= Hillsborough Township School District =

School district in Somerset County, New Jersey, US

Address
- 379 South Branch Road Hillsborough Township, Somerset County, New Jersey, 08844; United States
- Coordinates: 40.505059°N 74.673435°W

District information
- Grades: PreK-12
- Superintendent: Michael Volpe
- Business administrator: Gerald Eckert
- Schools: 9

Students and staff
- Enrollment: 7,288 (as of 2020–21)
- Faculty: 596.6 FTEs
- Student–teacher ratio: 12.2:1

Other information
- District Factor Group: I
- Website: www.htps.us
Ind.	Per pupil	District spending	Rank (*)	K-12 average	%± vs. average
1A	Total Spending	$17,505	37	$18,891	−7.3%
1	Budgetary Cost	13,624	36	14,783	−7.8%
2	Classroom Instruction	8,540	44	8,763	−2.5%
6	Support Services	2,447	64	2,392	2.3%
8	Administrative Cost	1,211	14	1,485	−18.5%
10	Operations & Maintenance	1,142	6	1,783	−36.0%
13	Extracurricular Activities	254	53	268	−5.2%
16	Median Teacher Salary	66,305	60	64,043
Data from NJDoE 2014 Taxpayers' Guide to Education Spending. *Of K-12 districts with more than 3,500 students. Lowest spending=1; Highest=103

The Hillsborough Township School District is a comprehensive community public school district that serves students in pre-kindergarten through twelfth grade from Hillsborough Township in Somerset County, in the U.S. state of New Jersey. Students from Millstone attend the district's schools, originally as part of a sending/receiving relationship; the New Jersey commissioner of education merged Millstone's non-operating school district with the Hillsborough Township School District, effective July 1, 2009.

As of the 2020–21 school year, the district, comprising nine schools, had an enrollment of 7,288 students and 596.6 classroom teachers (on an FTE basis), for a student–teacher ratio of 12.2:1.

The district is classified by the New Jersey Department of Education as being in District Factor Group "I", the second-highest of eight groupings. District Factor Groups organize districts statewide to allow comparison by common socioeconomic characteristics of the local districts. From lowest socioeconomic status to highest, the categories are A, B, CD, DE, FG, GH, I and J.

== History ==
Previously the district had free half-day kindergarten programs but not free full day kindergarten programs; New Jersey law allows school districts to have half-day kindergarten, and New Jersey law does not have kindergarten as a required educational stage. The district had an option where parents could pay to have their kindergarten-aged children in school the full day with an extension focused on playtime.

In December 2025 the school district enacted plans to create a full day kindergarten program, and it at the time was one of the few remaining school districts in the state to not have full day kindergarten. The district planned to change school attendance boundaries to accommodate larger numbers of students. Over 100 students are affected by the changes in attendance boundaries.

== Schools ==
Schools in the district (with 2020–21 enrollment data from the National Center for Education Statistics) are:

Elementary schools

- Amsterdam Elementary School (456 students; in grades K-4)
  - Michele Fisher, principal
- Hillsborough Elementary School (488; K-4)
  - Hetal Amin, principal
- Sunnymead Elementary School (495; K-4)
  - Tammy Jenkins, principal
  - By 2026, the school's enrollment exceeded capacity to the point where multiple additional rooms initially not intended to be classrooms, such as the designated principal's office, were used as classrooms. Victoria Gladstone of NJ.com characterized the area around the school as "a more rural section" of the township.
- Triangle Elementary School (354; K-4)
  - Anthony Aliperti, principal
- Woodfern Elementary School (354; K-4)
  - Steven Kerrigan, principal
- Woods Road Elementary School (421; PreK-4)
  - Thomas Rathjen, principal

Intermediate / middle schools

- Auten Road Intermediate School (1,143; 5-6)
  - Christopher Carey, principal
- Hillsborough Middle School (1,218; 7-8)
  - Joseph Trybulski, principal

High school

- Hillsborough High School (2,318; 9-12)
  - Jeffrey DiLollo, principal

== Former and converted schools ==
- Hillsborough Elementary School was previously the high school prior to 1969 (when the current high school opened), and after that became the middle school. After the current middle school opened in 1975, HES became a K-5 elementary school. However, it would quickly also then house all the 6th graders in town as overcapacity at (the new) HHS resulted in the 9th graders being moved to the new middle school in place of the 6th graders, who were moved down to HES. In 1987, the 9th graders returned to the high school and the 6th graders returned to the middle school from HES after an expansion to the high school was built to house the additional capacity.
- Amsterdam School was opened in 1990 after overcapacity at Woods Road School plus new housing developments being built in that section of the township. The school celebrated its 25th anniversary in the 2015-16 school year.
- Auten Road Intermediate School was opened in 1999 as a K-5 elementary school. However, when there was overcapacity at Hillsborough Middle School, then a 6-8 school, and the elementary schools (each of which housed 5th grade in addition to K-4 at the time), an expansion was built to Auten Road School to make it a 5-6 school in time for the 2002-03 school year. The other 6 elementary schools would now only house K-4 students and the middle school only had 7-8, and that configuration continues today.
- Liberty School was a two-room school built circa 1912 to replace an earlier one-room school of the same name. It was demolished in the early 1990s.

== Administration ==
Core members of the district's administration are:

- Michael Volpe, superintendent
- Gerald Eckert, business administrator and board secretary

Aiman Mahmoud, the district's business administrator and board secretary, resigned in December 2021. In the following days, Superintendent Lisa Antunes announced that she would be taking a leave of absence. The county prosecutor stated that an investigation into the district's finances would be undertaken in conjunction with the Hillsborough Township police. Mahmoud would be replaced by Gerald Eckert, the district's Assistant Business Administrator / Board Secretary from January 2008 to August 2014. After that, he was the Business Administrator / Board Secretary in Randolph Township Schools until he returned to Hillsborough. Antunes would eventually resign as superintendent in April 2022 during her leave of absence. She had been the superintendent since May 2020 after previously serving as acting superintendent from October 2019 to May 2020 after the abrupt retirement of previous superintendent Jorden Schiff. After Antunes began her leave of absence and after she resigned, Assistant Superintendent Kim Feltre would serve as acting superintendent. In August 2022, Daniel Fishbein was hired to serve as interim superintendent. Michael Volpe would become the permanent superintendent in January 2023.

== Board of education ==
The district's board of education, composed of nine members, sets policy and oversees the fiscal and educational operation of the district through its administration. As a Type II school district, the board's trustees are elected directly by voters to serve three-year terms of office on a staggered basis, with three seats up for election each year held (since 2013) as part of the November general election. The board appoints a superintendent to oversee the district's day-to-day operations and a business administrator to supervise the business functions of the district.
