= Rocco George =

Filipino-American singer-songwriter (born 2003)

Rocco
- Born: Rocco Gabriel George; May 29, 2003 (age 23); Quezon City, Philippines
- Genres: Indie pop; bedroom pop
- Occupation: Singer-songwriter
- Years active: 2020–present
- Labels: Smoking Gun Music; Young Forever
- Website: rocco.cool

Rocco Gabriel George (born May 29, 2003), also known mononymously as Rocco, is a Filipino-American singer-songwriter. He began his music career after going viral on TikTok while still in high school. In 2022, he released "spin you round", his breakout single, and followed it up the next year with the release of an EP, Her Favorite Flowers. He released his debut studio album, Skin & Bone, in 2025.

== Early life ==
Rocco Gabriel George was born on May 29, 2003, in Quezon City, Philippines. He later moved to New Jersey and attended Hillsborough High School as part of the class of 2021. George began recording music at a friend's home studio at fourteen, inspired by his brother and his Filipino culture's love for karaoke. His music then was more hip-hop. He was inspired to create content by Ryan Higa and KevJumba.

== Career ==
George originally went viral through TikTok while a junior at Hillsborough. He was encouraged to begin posting on the app by his friends and he became known for his singing, skits, and videos about his Filipino heritage. George also created a clothing brand, Atlantic, which he funded through selling Skittles he bought from Costco. He released his debut EP, Romeo, in April 2020 and, after moving to Los Angeles, dropped his breakout single, "spin you round", in 2022. His second EP, Her Favorite Flowers was released in September 2023 and contained lyrics about George's vulnerability in his youth and his emotions during that time. The next year, he made his festival debut at Outside Lands 2024. George's debut album, Skin & Bone, was released in June 2025; his brother was a key producer on the album. In July 2026, released the first act of A Comedy Romantic, an episodic narrative series and soundtrack that he began posting on his social media pages. He was inspired by romantic comedy media from the '90s and '00s.

== Influences and artistry ==
George's music has been classified as indie pop and bedroom pop. He was inspired by Clairo, Dominic Fike, Boy Pablo, and Rex Orange County. His 2023 EP Her Favorite Flowers was described as "full of romantic pop anthems, bossa nova inspired rhythms, and youthful ballads."

== Discography ==
=== Studio albums ===
Title	Details
Skin & Bone	Released: June 20, 2025; Label: Smoking Gun Music; Formats: LP, digital download

=== Extended plays ===
Title	Details
Romeo	Released: April 11, 2020; Label: Self-released; Formats: Digital download
Her Favorite Flowers	Released: September 21, 2023; Label: Young Forever; Formats: Digital download
A Comedy Romantic (Act. 1)	Released: July 24, 2026; Label: Self-released; Formats: Digital download

=== Singles ===
Title	Year	Album
"Soda"	2020	Romeo
"High Heel Walk"	2020	Non-album single
"Runner Boy"	2020	Non-album single
"Stuck"	2020	Non-album single
"Unreciprocated Love"	2020	Non-album single
"Clouds"	2021	Non-album single
"Ring!"	2021	Non-album single
"Boy In Love"	2021	Non-album single
"Feels Like a Dream"	2022	Non-album single
"spin you round"	2022	Non-album single
"be careful with my heart"	2022	Non-album single
"Steal This Night"	2022	Non-album single
"l-o-v-e"	2023	Non-album single
"Apples"	2023	Non-album single
"In The Morning"	2023	Her Favorite Flowers
"Sunny"	2023	Her Favorite Flowers
"Wrap Me Up"	2023	Non-album single
"Baby Blue"	2024	Non-album single
"Every Kind of Way"	2024	Non-album single
"what am i to you?"	2024	Non-album single
"If Only With You"	2025	Skin & Bone
"Only Boy"	2025	Skin & Bone
"Door"	2025	Skin & Bone
"If It Takes Us All Night"	2026	Non-album single
"perfect song to slow dance to"	2026	Non-album single
"Break"	2026	A Comedy Romantic (Act. 1)
