= Hillsborough (CDP), New Jersey =

Populated place in Somerset County, New Jersey, US

Hillsborough, New Jersey
- Census-designated place
- Location in Somerset County Location in New Jersey Location in the United States
- Coordinates: 40°30′23″N 74°39′9″W
- Country: United States
- State: New Jersey
- County: Somerset
- Township: Hillsborough

Area
  - Total: 8.02 sq mi (20.77 km^{2})
  - Land: 8.00 sq mi (20.72 km^{2})
  - Water: 0.019 sq mi (0.05 km^{2})
- Elevation: 110 ft (34 m)

Population (2020)
  - Total: 22,214
  - Density: 2,776.1/sq mi (1,071.9/km^{2})
- Time zone: UTC−05:00 (Eastern (EST))
  - Summer (DST): UTC−04:00 (EDT)
- ZIP Code: 08844
- Area code: 908
- FIPS code: 34-31880
- GNIS feature ID: 2806101

Hillsborough is a census-designated place (CDP) located in the center of Hillsborough Township, Somerset County, in the U.S. state of New Jersey. It was first listed as a CDP prior to the 2020 census.

The CDP is in south-central Somerset County and is bordered to the northwest by Flagtown, to the west by Neshanic, and to the south by Belle Mead. U.S. Route 206 passes through the community, leading north 5 miles (8 km) to Somerville, the county seat, and south 12 miles (19 km) to Princeton.

== Demographics ==
Historical population
Census	Pop.	Note	%±
2020	22,214		—
U.S. Decennial Census; 2020

Hillsborough was first listed as a census designated place in the 2020 U.S. census.

Hillsborough CDP, New Jersey – Racial and ethnic composition Note: the US Census treats Hispanic/Latino as an ethnic category. This table excludes Latinos from the racial categories and assigns them to a separate category. Hispanics/Latinos may be of any race.
Race / Ethnicity (NH = Non-Hispanic)	Pop 2020	2020
White alone (NH)	12,820	57.71%
Black or African American alone (NH)	1,299	5.85%
Native American or Alaska Native alone (NH)	16	0.07%
Asian alone (NH)	4,644	20.91%
Native Hawaiian or Pacific Islander alone (NH)	2	0.01%
Other race alone (NH)	124	0.56%
Mixed race or Multiracial (NH)	759	3.42%
Hispanic or Latino (any race)	2,550	11.48%
Total	22,214	100.00%

As of 2020, the area had a population of 22,214.
