= Kristin Malko =

American actress (born 1982)

- Born: Kristin Michele Malko; November 15, 1982 (age 44); Hillsborough Township, NJ
- Occupation: Television actress
- Spouse: Eric Rywalski (m. 2013)

Kristin Malko (born November 15, 1982) is an American actress who appeared on Prison Break.

== Early life ==
Malko grew up in Hillsborough Township, New Jersey and graduated from Hillsborough High School in New Jersey, and then Sarah Lawrence College in New York, where she began acting after her freshman year.

== Career ==
She played Debra Jean Belle on the show Prison Break. Malko's character on the show falls in love with Lane Garrison's character, David "Tweener" Apolskis.

== Filmography ==
- Out of the Box (2020) as Annie
- The Choosing (2017) as Daisy
- Your Baby (2015) as Kristen
- I'm Not Adam (2014) as Sam
- Bobbington (2013) as Jane
- Jack's Not Sick Anymore (2013) as Julia
- The Secret Lives of Wives (2012) as Del
- Reel Dudes (2012) as Kate
- Happy Endings (2012) as Kat
- Moving Takahashi (2011) as Juliana
- The Great Gatsby in Five Minutes (2011) as Jordan Baker
- Lost in Sound (2010) as Christine
- To Those Who Wait (2010) as Waitress
- Holly Would Show (2009) as Momany Smith
- Friday Night Lights (2008) as Assistant
- Prison Break (2006) as Debra Jean Bell
