= Shaun O'Hara =

American football player (born 1977)

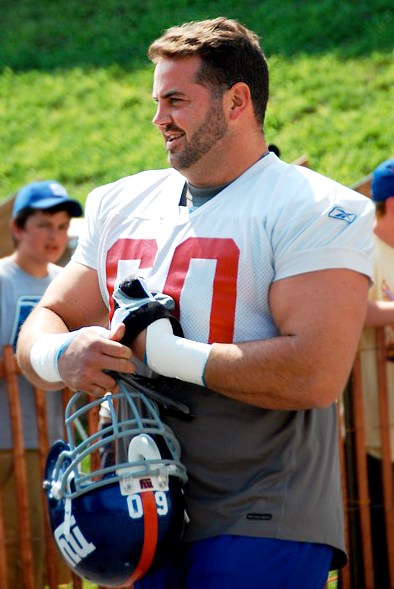
- O'Hara with the New York Giants in 2007

No. 60
- Position: Center

Personal information
- Born: June 23, 1977 (age 49); Chicago Heights, Illinois, U.S.
- Listed height: 6 ft 3 in (1.91 m)
- Listed weight: 303 lb (137 kg)

Career information
- High school: Hillsborough (Hillsborough Township, New Jersey)
- College: Rutgers (1995–1999)
- NFL draft: 2000: undrafted

Career history
- Cleveland Browns (2000–2003); New York Giants (2004–2010)

Awards and highlights
- Super Bowl champion (XLII); First-team All-Pro (2008); Second-team All-Pro (2008); 3× Pro Bowl (2008–2010); 65th greatest New York Giant of all-time; First-team All-Big East (1999)

Career NFL statistics
- Games played: 151
- Games started: 135
- Fumble recoveries: 1
- Stats at Pro Football Reference

Shaun O'Hara (born June 23, 1977) is an American former professional football player who was a center for 11 seasons in the National Football League (NFL). He played college football for the Rutgers Scarlet Knights. He started in the NFL by signing as an undrafted free agent with the Cleveland Browns, and spent the majority of his career with the New York Giants. He was a three-time Pro Bowl selection.

== Early life ==
O'Hara grew up in Hillsborough Township, New Jersey and attended Hillsborough High School (New Jersey). He also spent some of his childhood in Medina, Ohio.

== College career ==
He attended Rutgers University in New Jersey, where he walked on and played for the Rutgers Scarlet Knights football team from 1995 to 1999.

== Professional career ==
O'Hara's career began with the Cleveland Browns, where he played center and guard and after signing as a rookie free agent in 2000. While a Brown, O'Hara started 38 of 54 games, including the final 34 that he played. He signed a three-year $5.4 million contract with the Giants on March 7, 2004, with the intention of playing center, which he considers his more natural position, as well as to help bolster an offensive line that was often criticized as one of the problems in the Giants' 2003 season.

In his first year with the team, O'Hara's season was nearly ended by a case of athlete's foot, which developed into a staph infection, raising discussion about the presence of staph in NFL locker rooms.

O'Hara re-signed with the Giants in March 2007 keeping him off the free agent market, despite initial concerns about whether a deal was possible. The Giants' offensive line has been viewed by some as one of the keys to the team's success, which was cemented following Super Bowl XLII and in the leadup thereto, but was seen as early as 2005.

Despite initial impressions that O'Hara was not a Pro Bowl caliber player, he was named a reserve in the 2008 Pro Bowl, named a starter in the 2009 Pro Bowl, and to the 2010 Pro Bowl, although he did not play due to injury.

On July 28, 2011, he was released by the New York Giants.

Shaun O'Hara officially announced his retirement as a New York Giant on September 3, 2012. He is now a color analyst for NFL Network and ESPN Radio, and a regular fill-in host for Good Morning Football. Since 2022, he has been the co-host of the Eli Manning Show on the Giants' Youtube channel.

== Off-field activity ==
O'Hara was a member of the Giants' leadership council and was a team co-captain for the 2007 season. He was also the Giants' team representative to the players' union and was very outspoken about the role of the players' union and its leadership.

He was named Giants Man of the Year for his community involvement as well as United Way's Hometown Hero in 2005 and has also worked with a number of organizations to support the communities where he lives. In March 2009, he was honored by the American Ireland Fund as one of the most noted and successful Irish American figures today.

In April 2009, O'Hara, along with his wife Amy, launched the Shaun O'Hara Foundation, whose mission is to increase knowledge and education for life-threatening diseases for which there is limited funding.
