= Dustin Sheppard =

American soccer player (born 1980)

Personal information
- Full name: Dustin Sheppard
- Date of birth: September 23, 1980 (age 46)
- Place of birth: New Brunswick, New Jersey, United States
- Height: 5 ft 11 in (1.80 m)
- Position: Striker

Youth career
- Rutgers Scarlet Knights

Senior career*
Years	Team	Apps	(Gls)
2002	MetroStars	2	(0)
- * Club domestic league appearances and goals

Dustin Sheppard (born September 23, 1980, in New Brunswick, New Jersey) is an American retired professional soccer player.

Raised in Hillsborough Township, New Jersey, Shepard attended Hillsborough High School.

== Playing career ==
Sheppard was signed to a developmental contract with MetroStars after graduating from Rutgers University.

== Statistics ==
Club performance			League		Cup		League Cup		Continental		Total	
Season	Club	League	Apps	Goals	Apps	Goals	Apps	Goals	Apps	Goals	Apps	Goals
USA			League		Open Cup		League Cup		North America		Total	
2002	MetroStars	MLS	2	0	1	0	0	0	0	0	3	0
Career total			2	0	1	0	0	0	0	0	3	0
