= Lori Alhadeff =

American activist (born 1975)

Member of the Broward County School Board, Seat 4
- Incumbent
- Assumed office November 24, 2018
- Preceded by: Abby Freedman

Personal details
- Born: Lori Robinovitz; February 11, 1975 (age 51) Hillsborough Township, New Jersey, U.S.
- Party: Democratic (2018-present)
- Other political affiliations: Republican (until 2018)
- Spouse: Ilan Alhadeff
- Children: 3, including Alyssa Alhadeff
- Education: The College of New Jersey (B.S.); Gratz College (M.A.)

Lori Alhadeff (née Robinovitz; born February 11, 1975) is an American activist, member of the Broward County School Board, and founder of school-safety organization Make Our Schools Safe. Her 14-year-old daughter, Alyssa Alhadeff, was murdered in the Parkland high school shooting on February 14, 2018. Alhadeff gained national attention after making an appearance the day after the shooting on CNN, pleading President Trump to increase school security and calls for gun control.

== Education ==
Lori Robinovitz grew up in Hillsborough Township, New Jersey, where she attended Hillsborough High School and played on the school's soccer team. She earned a Bachelor of Science in health and physical education from The College of New Jersey. She completed a Master of Arts in education at Gratz College. She is certified in the states of New Jersey and New York in health and physical education.

== Career ==
Alhadeff worked for the Union Township School District over the course of four years. She was a volleyball, cheerleading, and softball coach. Alhadeff worked for a year as a health and physical education teacher at the Windward School where she also coached cheerleading. A former soccer player, Alhadeff coached the sport for years.

== Activism ==
On February 14, 2018, Alhadeff's daughter Alyssa was killed in the Parkland high school shooting. Alhadeff and her husband attended a memorial for the victims at Pine Trails Park the following day, where she appeared on CNN, pleading President Donald Trump demanding action to increase gun control and improve school safety.

Alhadeff founded a nonprofit organization, Make Our Schools Safe, which is aimed at providing safety features tailored to the specific needs of schools. These features include metal detectors, bullet-resistant glass and enhanced fencing and gates.

In March, she traveled to Tallahassee to work alongside other victim's families to pass the Florida Senate Bill 7026. She attended the March for Our Lives rally in Washington, D.C.

In April 2018, Alhadeff announced her candidacy alongside Ryan Petty for the Broward County School Board. On August 28, 2018, Alhadeff was elected to the District 4 seat with 65% of the vote.

On February 2, 2019, New Jersey Governor Phil Murphy signed A764, also known as "Alyssa's Law", requiring all New Jersey public schools to install silent panic alarms that will alert law enforcement during emergencies such as an active shooter, or to employ an alternative emergency mechanism approved by the Department of Education.

Alhadeff was re-elected to the District 4 seat in 2022, during a period of significant turbulence on the board, which saw four of its members suspended by Governor Ron DeSantis following recommendations by a grand jury convened in the wake of the Parkland shooting. She subsequently served as chair of the Broward County Public Schools board from 2022 to 2024.

== Personal life ==
Alhadeff is a fundraising volunteer for the Parkland Soccer Club. She is Jewish.
