= Adam Mamawala =

American stand-up comic (born 1987)

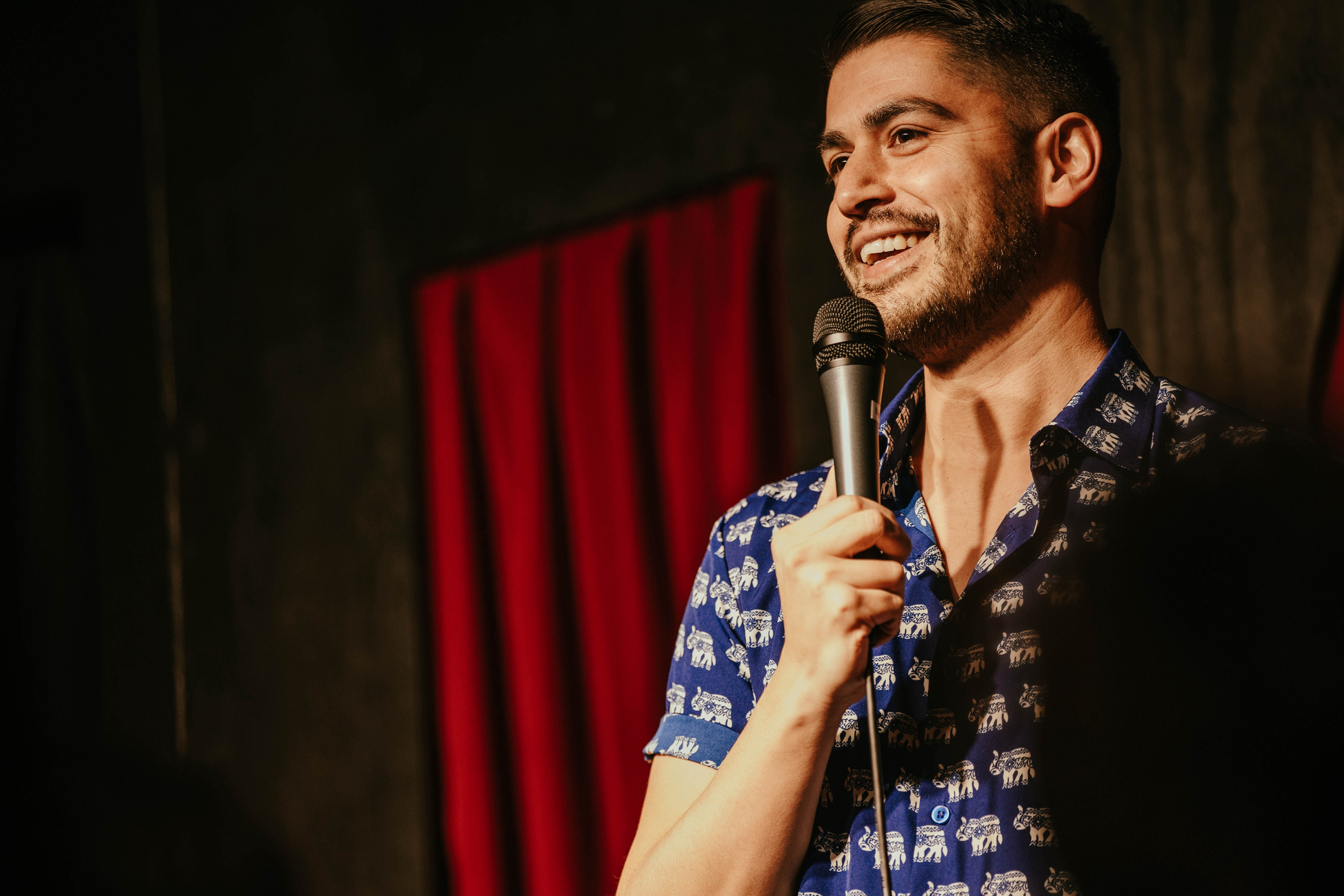
Mamawala at Dallas Comedy Club, 2024

Adam Mamawala (/ˌmɑːməˈwɑːlə/ MAH-mə-WAH-lə; born May 18, 1987) is an American stand-up comedian based out of New York City.

Mamawala has appeared on Comedy Central, MTV, BET, and SiriusXM, and both of his albums, More Relatable (2022) and One of the Good Ones (2017) debuted at #1 on the iTunes Comedy Charts. He has been a freelance contributor to Saturday Night Live's Weekend Update and Someecards and co-hosts the basketball podcast HORSE. Mamawala played the lead character in a 6 episode indie romantic comedy series Under Cover Comic (2022), streaming on Amazon Prime, Roku and Tubi.

Since 2024, he has toured the country as one of Dane Cook’s feature acts, performing at iconic venues such as The Fillmore in Detroit, The Met in Philadelphia and New York City’s Beacon Theatre.

== Early life and education ==
Mamawala was born in Aurora, Illinois, to an Indian father from Pune, India and a German-American mother from Whitewater, Wisconsin. His father studied in Morocco before moving to the United States to pursue his MBA, later working in financial services for MetLife and MassMutual, while his mother was a special education teachers' aide. Mamawala graduated from Hillsborough High School in Hillsborough Township, New Jersey in 2005 and graduated from The College of New Jersey in Ewing Township, New Jersey, with a degree in Communication Studies in 2009.
