= Yannick Smith =

American soccer player (born 1990)

Personal information
- Full name: Yannick Camara Smith
- Date of birth: November 21, 1990 (age 35)
- Place of birth: Hillsborough Township, New Jersey, United States
- Height: 5 ft 9 in (1.75 m)
- Position: Forward

Youth career
- 2009–2012: Old Dominion Monarchs

Senior career*
| Years | Team | Apps | (Gls) |
| 2011 | Virginia Beach Piranhas | 11 | (2) |
| 2013 | Närpes Kraft | 22 | (12) |
| 2014 | Dayton Dutch Lions | 2 | (0) |
- * Club domestic league appearances and goals as of August 22, 2014

Yannick Smith (born November 21, 1990) is an American former soccer player who played as a forward.

== Career ==
Born in Hillsborough Township, New Jersey, Smith played soccer at Hillsborough High School.

Smith played four years of college soccer at Old Dominion University between 2009 and 2012. He also spent the 2011 season with USL Premier Development League club Virginia Beach Piranhas.

On January 22, 2013, Smith was selected 75th overall in the 2013 MLS Supplemental Draft by Houston Dynamo. However, he wasn't signed by the club.

Smith signed his first professional contract with Finnish Kakkonen club Närpes Kraft, before moving to USL Pro club Dayton Dutch Lions on March 9, 2014.
