= James E. McLeod =

American scholar

James Earl McLeod
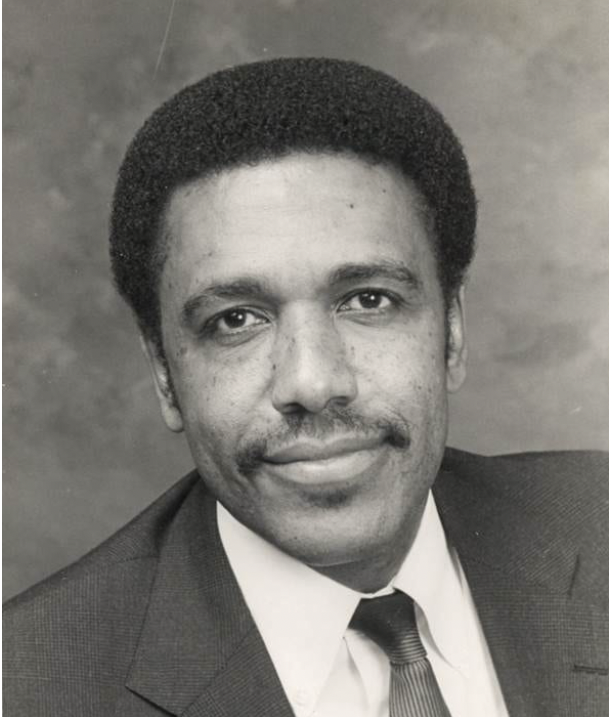
- McLeod while Dean of the College of Arts and Sciences at Washington University in St. Louis
- Born: July 29, 1944; Dothan, Alabama
- Died: September 6, 2011 (aged 67)
- Other name: Jim

Academic background
- Education: Morehouse College (BA); University of Vienna; Rice University

Academic work
- Discipline: Germanic studies

James Earl McLeod (July 29, 1944 – September 6, 2011), also known as Jim McLeod, was a scholar of Germanic studies and administrator at Washington University in St. Louis. He served as assistant dean of the Graduate School of Arts & Sciences, chair of the African American Studies department, dean of the College of Arts & Sciences, and Vice Chancellor for students. He also founded and directed the John B. Ervin Scholars Program.

== Early life and education ==
McLeod was second oldest of five siblings to James Clarence (JC) and H. Earline Jackson McLeod. Born and raised in Dothan, Alabama, McLeod attended Carver High School in the Dothan City School System. At age 16, McLeod enrolled at Morehouse College in Atlanta, Georgia. During his time at Morehouse, he studied at the institute of European Studies at the University of Vienna. Upon his return to the United States, McLeod graduated with a Bachelor of Arts in German and Chemistry. McLeod continued his post graduate studies as a Woodrow Wilson Fellow at Rice University in Houston, Texas. His graduate work consisted primarily on turn-of-the-century Vienna and post-war Germany.

== Career ==
McLeod began his teaching career as an assistant professor of German at Indiana University in Bloomington, Indiana. After his time at Indiana University, McLeod began teaching at Washington University in St. Louis in the German department in 1974. During his time at Washington University in St. Louis, he served as Assistant to Chancellor William H. Danforth from 1977 to 1987 before serving as the director of the school's African and Afro-American Studies Program from 1987 to 1992. Following that position, he was appointed as Dean of the College of Arts and Sciences in 1992 before being appointed as Vice Chancellor for Students in 1995. He also assisted in launching the university's Black Alumni Council and guided the university in joining the network of schools that participate in the Mellon Mays Undergraduate Fellowship.

In 1986, McLeod oversaw the creation and acted as director of the John B. Ervin Scholars Program (noted below), which was originally named the John B. Ervin Scholars Program for Black Americans.

In addition to his work at Washington University in St. Louis, McLeod also sat on the board of trustees of the St. Louis Art Museum, American Youth Foundation, National Council on Youth Leadership, Mary Institute and St. Louis Country Day School, and Churchill Center & School for Learning Disabilities.

== Scholars Programs ==
=== John B. Ervin Scholars Program ===
McLeod is credited for establishing the John B. Ervin Scholars Program in 1987, which was originally established to focus on the recruitment and retention of African-American students at WashU by offering a merit-based full tuition scholarship to African-American students with exceptional academic performance. He not only established the program, but he served as the first director of the Ervin Scholars Program.

Additionally, the other signature scholars programs, the Annika Rodriguez Scholars Program and the Danforth Scholars Program, at Washington University in St. Louis—as well as other programs across the country—have drawn on the successes and developments of the Ervin Scholars Program.

=== McLeod Scholars Program ===
In 2011, WashU established the McLeod Scholars Program, an undergraduate endowment in honor of McLeod. The selection criteria for McLeod Scholars include academic achievement, commitment to serve others, leadership potential, and character. The selection pool consists of students chosen in the other scholarship programs at WashU. These programs are the Danforth Scholars Program, John B. Ervin Scholars Program, and Annika Rodriguez Scholars Program (all noted above) housed by the Office of Scholars Programs (OSP). A student from each of these programs is selected every year, totaling to three scholars per year.

=== Other Scholars Programs ===
McLeod also served as the director of the Enterprise Rent-a-Car Scholars Program.

== Honors, awards, and legacy ==
Among McLeod's recognitions during his life were the Distinguished Faculty Award in 1991, the Rosa L. Parks Award for meritorious service in 2007, the Saint Louis American Foundation's 2008 Lifetime Achiever, the William Greenleaf Eliot Society's Search Award in 2010, and the 2011 CoroLeadership Award.

Following his death, the Washington University Center for the Humanities instituted an annual Writing Prize for freshman students, and Gerald Early established the annual James E. McLeod Memorial Lecture on Higher Education, with Walter E. Massey giving the inaugural lecture.

In 2026, it was announced that a new student housing building on the WashU campus would be named after James and Clara McLeod.

== Publications ==
Furthermore, McLeod authored Habits of Achievement: Lessons for a Life Well-Lived in 2013 which detailed the speech he delivered every year to incoming Ervin Scholars during his role as the Director of the Ervin Scholars Program. The book covers a biographical summary of his life along with remembrances from Ervin alumni.

In 1995, McLeod also co-authored Interpretationen: Goethes Erzählwerk. (Lernmaterialien) with Paul Michael Lützeler.
