= Hillsborough High School (New Jersey) =

High school in Somerset County, New Jersey, US

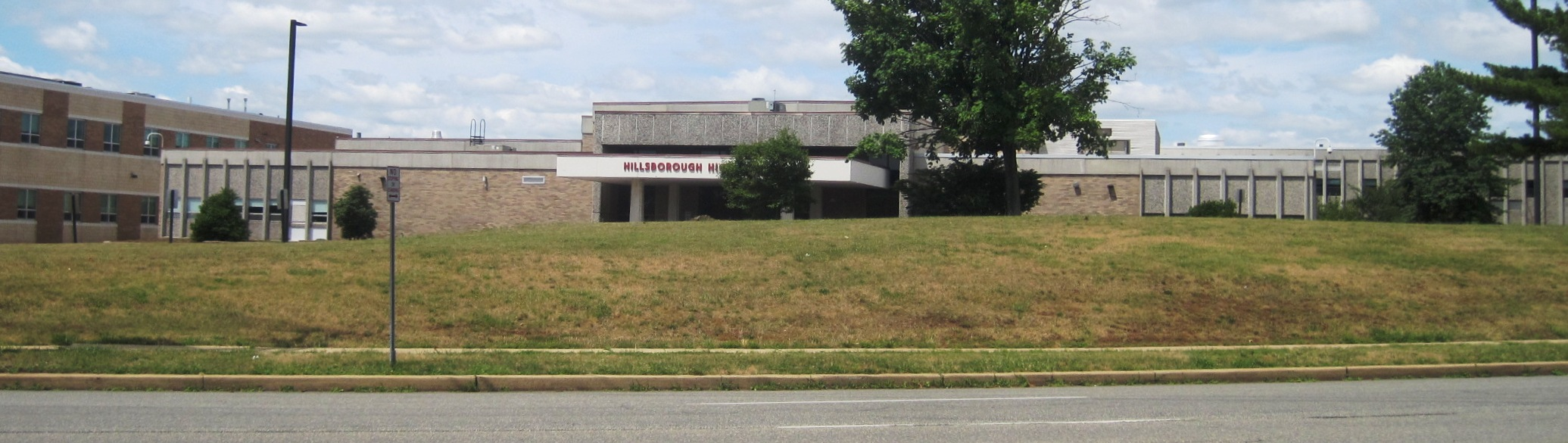
- Front of the school

Location
- 466 Raider Boulevard; Hillsborough Township, Somerset County, New Jersey, 08844; United States
- 40°29′46″N 74°39′22″W

Information
- School type: Public, high school
- Established: September 1969
- School district: Hillsborough Township School District
- NCES School ID: 340723005222
- Principal: Jeffrey DiLollo
- Faculty: 175.5 FTEs
- Grades: 9 - 12
- Enrollment: 2,377 (as of 2024–25)
- Student to teacher ratio: 13.5:1
- Colors: Cardinal and gold
- Athletics conference: Skyland Conference (general); Big Central Football Conference (football)
- Team name: Raiders
- Newspaper: The Voice
- Yearbook: Ramrod
- Website: hhs.htps.us

Hillsborough High School is a four-year comprehensive public high school that serves students in ninth through twelfth grades from Hillsborough Township in Somerset County, in the U.S. state of New Jersey, operating as the lone secondary school of the Hillsborough Township School District. Students from Millstone also attend the school, after Millstone was integrated into the Hillsborough district, prior to which they had attended as part of a sending/receiving relationship.

As of the 2024–25 school year, the school had an enrollment of 2,377 students and 175.5 classroom teachers (on an FTE basis), for a student–teacher ratio of 13.5:1. There were 306 students (12.9% of enrollment) eligible for free lunch and 67 (2.8% of students) eligible for reduced-cost lunch.

== History ==
Prior to the construction of the high school, students from Hillsborough Township attended Somerville High School for grades 9-12 as part of a sending/receiving relationship. The Somerville Public Schools had notified the district in the early 1960s that Hillsborough students could not be accommodated in Somerville after 1968. The Hillsborough district attempted unsuccessfully to seek partners for a regional district and had voters reject by a nearly 3-1 margin a 1964 referendum that would have allocated $2.9 million for a high school. By 1966, Hillsborough was paying tuition for nearly 500 students to attend school in Somerville for grades 9-12, with that number expected to grow to exceed 900 by 1968.

Constructed at a cost of $3.5 million (equivalent to $30.7 million in 2025), the not-yet-fully-completed school opened in September 1969 with 730 students in grades 9 and 10, with those in grades 11 and 12 completing their high school education in Somerville.

== Awards, recognition and rankings ==
The school was the 74th-ranked public high school in New Jersey out of 339 schools statewide in New Jersey Monthly magazine's September 2014 cover story on the state's "Top Public High Schools", using a new ranking methodology. The school had been ranked 106th in the state of 328 schools in 2012, after being ranked 81st in 2010 out of 322 schools listed. The magazine ranked the school 84th in 2008 out of 316 schools. The school was ranked 100th in the magazine's September 2006 issue, which included 316 schools across the state. Schooldigger.com ranked the school 69th out of 381 public high schools statewide in its 2011 rankings (a decrease of 12 positions from the 2010 ranking) which were based on the combined percentage of students classified as proficient or above proficient on the mathematics (89.1%) and language arts literacy (97.3%) components of the High School Proficiency Assessment (HSPA).

In its listing of "America's Best High Schools 2016", the school was ranked 217th out of 500 best high schools in the country; it was ranked 34th among all high schools in New Jersey and 17th among the state's non-magnet schools.

In its 2013 report on "America's Best High Schools", The Daily Beast ranked the school 740th in the nation among participating public high schools and 57th among schools in New Jersey.

In 2024 the school awarded with a Silver Distinction and earned the Advanced Placement (AP) Access Award.

== Clubs ==
Hillsborough High School has 74 different clubs and activities. Students can submit proposals and make new clubs with a faculty member and administration approval.

=== Marching Band - "The Pride of Hillsborough" ===
Under the direction of Jules Haran and Nicholas Clipperton, HHS Raider Marching Band took the title of 2018 Mid-Atlantic Regional Champions with a score of 98.125, 2017 Group V Open State Champions, 2015 Group V Open State Champions, 2014 Group V Open State Champions, 2011 Group V Open State Champions, 2010 Group V Open Northern State Champion with a score of 97.175 in Allentown, Pennsylvania. In 2006, at the USSBA National Championships at Navy–Marine Corps Memorial Stadium in Annapolis, Maryland, Hillsborough High School was recognized as Best Color Guard National Championship title in Class IV. Also in 2006. at the USSBA-hosted state championships at Rowan University in Glassboro, Hillsborough High School took the title of Group IV Open state champions for the fourth consecutive year.

=== Debate club ===
One of the most popular and successful clubs at the school is Model United Nations and Model Congress, collectively known as HHS Debate. HHS Debate regularly wins delegation awards and many individual awards at conferences all across the country. In 2008, HHS Debate picked up the Best Delegation Award from Duke Model United Nations, with every individual member of the team winning an individual award. In 2009, the team won Best Delegation at Virginia Model United Nations. At Hillsborough's flagship conference, Rutgers Model Congress, the team has won a first or second place delegation award for nine out of ten years.

=== Robotics ===
In 2007, the school's robotics team helped pass legislation through the New Jersey Senate recognizing FIRST. This dedicated the week of February 26 through March 3, 2007, to FIRST in an effort to support science, technology, as well as all the participants at FIRST. The robotics team, known formally as Team 75, has continuously worked with NJ legislature to support recognition for science and technology and is the oldest active FIRST team in New Jersey. The team also won the 2007 Chesapeake Regional and the 2007 Chairman's Award at the NJ Regional.

=== The Student Diversity Initiative ===
The Student Diversity Initiative is a student-run group that strives to promote unbiased, authentic discussion, thorough education, and widespread awareness of diversity issues to make systemic changes in schools and communities. The ultimate goal is to cultivate community conversations at every level to shift perspectives and to challenge prejudice within NJ. In 2020, the Student Diversity Initiative hosted a National Day of Racial Healing, and a Christmas Donations to Children in Need. In 2021, they hosted The Black Experience in America: A Closer Look - a panel in honor of Black History Month, spoke at Kean University to numerous NJ school districts, and hosted conversations with teachers, businesses, schools, and administrators to help evolve the current curriculum.

The Student Diversity Initiative's current path towards world unity, community, and liberation is to organize events to create cultural awareness on racial literacy, discrimination, race, gender, diversity, and age while cultivating numerous diverse sets of voices.

== Athletics ==
The Hillsborough High School Raiders competes in the Skyland Conference, which includes public and private high schools covering Hunterdon, Somerset and Warren counties in west Central Jersey, operating under the supervision of the New Jersey State Interscholastic Athletic Association (NJSIAA). With 1,723 students in grades 10-12, the school was classified by the NJSIAA for the 2019–20 school year as Group IV for most athletic competition purposes, which included schools with an enrollment of 1,060 to 5,049 students in that grade range. The football team competes in Division 5B of the Big Central Football Conference, which includes 60 public and private high schools in Hunterdon, Middlesex, Somerset, Union and Warren counties, which are broken down into 10 divisions by size and location. The school was classified by the NJSIAA as Group V South for football for 2024–2026, which included schools with 1,333 to 2,324 students.

The girls' basketball team won the Group IV State Championship in 2025 defeating West Orange 55-52 and finishing the season with a 26-6 record and ranked #4 in the state. The previous season they won the 2024 North Jersey Section 2 Group IV Sectional Championship by defeating Elizabeth 59-46.

The field hockey team won the Central Jersey Group III state sectional title in 1977-1979 and 1981-1983; the team was Group III co-champion in 1983 with Montville Township High School.

The girls' soccer team was Group III co-champion in 1992 with Northern Highlands Regional High School.

The football team won the South Jersey Group 5 regional championship in 2021 defeating Kingsway 28-7. This was a transition year where previously the football season ended with the sectional championships. For the 2021 season, the football calendar ended with group champions for South Jersey and North Jersey. For 2022 and later, the football seasons progressed to crown overall group champions for the entire state. The football team won the Central Jersey Group III state sectional championship in 1980 and the Central Jersey Group IV title in 2000. The 2000 team held off a late comeback by Sayreville War Memorial High School to win the Central Jersey Group IV title by a score of 16-13 in the playoff finals.

The baseball team won the Group IV state championship in 2005, finishing the season with a 21-5 record after defeating Watchung Hills Regional High School by a score of 5-0 in the tournament final. In 2005, the boys' baseball team won the Somerset County Championship, the Central Jersey Group IV sectional final and the Group IV finals. The team has won the Somerset County Tournament in 1977, 1979, 2005, 2012, 2014 and 2015; the six titles (through 2018) are tied for second-most in the tournament's history since it was established in 1973.

The boys swimming team won the Public A state championship in 2005. The boys' swimming team won the 2007 Central - A state championship with a 103-67 win against Montgomery High School. In 2009, David Wilson broke his own school record (21.05) for the 50 freestyle to win the individual state championship and claim the title of "fastest man in the state." At the Meet of Champions, Wilson earned All-American status for the butterfly 200 medley relay.

The ice hockey team won the Monsignor Kelly Cup in 2006.

The boys' track team was Group IV indoor relay co-champion in 2008 with Trenton Central High School.

In 2008, Mary Kate Lynch was honored at the NJSIAA Annual Scholar Athlete Luncheon representing Hillsborough High School.

In 2009, Steven Wu won the singles title at the Somerset County Boys Tennis Tournament. In 2022, the team was the Somerset County Tournament co-champion along with Pingry School. In 2023, the team won the Group IV sectional title, defeating South Brunswick High School 3-2 in the final.

The rugby team participates in a competitive league with schools such as Delbarton School, Xavier High School, and Darien High School.

The girls' cross country team won the Group IV state championship from 2010-2012 and 2014 and won the Meet of Champions in 2009 and 2010. In 2009, the team won the overall state championship by defeating Randolph High School by a single point, 78-79, to win the Meet of Champions in Holmdel. In 2010, the team won the Group IV state title and repeated as the overall state champion by winning the Meet of Champions by a 95-111 margin over Voorhees, earning the team recognition by The Star-Ledger as its team of the year.

The girls' indoor / winter track team won the Group I state championship in 2020.

== Graduation requirements ==
New Jersey State law requires that every student pass the New Jersey Graduation Proficiency Assessment (NJGPA) and successfully complete the following courses:

Department	Minimum Credits
Language Arts	20
Mathematics	15
Science	15
Social Studies	15
Physical Education, Health, or JROTC	20
Visual and Performing Arts	5
World Language	5
Career Education or Life Skills	5
Electives	20
Total Minimum Credits	120

All students must carry at least 30 credits to be promoted to the next grade level. These graduation requirements only apply to students currently in 10th-12th grade.

== New graduation requirements ==
Beginning with the graduating class of 2012, graduation requirements (with course credits listed in parentheses) are Language Arts Literacy (20, aligned to grade 9-12 New Jersey Core Curriculum Content Standards standards), Mathematics (15, includes Algebra I content, Geometry content, and Algebra II content), Science (15, includes biology, chemistry and additional lab science), Social Studies (15, includes integrated civics, economics, geography, and global content), Economics (2.5, includes financial, economic, business and entrepreneurial literacy), Physical Education, Health, or JROTC (20), Visual and Performing Arts (5), World Language (5), Career Education or Life Skills (5) and Electives (20).

== Administration ==
The school's principal is Jeffrey DiLollo. His core administration team includes four vice principals.

== Notable alumni ==
- Lori Alhadeff (born 1975), activist and member of the Broward County School Board who founded Make Our Schools Safe after her daughter Alyssa was killed in the Stoneman Douglas High School shooting
- Michael Ian Black (born 1971, class of 1988), comedian
- Jasmine Brown, author and medical student
- Rocco George (born 2003, class of 2021), singer-songwriter
- Daria Hazuda (class of 1977), biochemist and discoverer of HIV Integrase strand transfer inhibitors
- Nina Jankowicz (born 1988/89, class of 2007), researcher and writer
- Yuval Levin (born 1977, class of 1995), political scientist and journalist, founding editor of National Affairs.
- Kristin Malko (born 1982, class of 2001), actress who appeared on Prison Break
- Adam Mamawala (born 1987), comedian
- Shawn Mayer (born 1979, class of 1999), professional American football player, currently a safety on the Cleveland Browns practice squad
- Shaun O'Hara (born 1977, class of 1995), former NFL player for the Cleveland Browns from 2000-2004 and the New York Giants as the starting center from 2004-2011
- Ricky Proehl (born 1968, class of 1986), 18-year NFL veteran
- Dustin Sheppard (born 1980), soccer player
- Yannick Smith (born 1990), professional soccer forward
