= List of invasive plant species in New Jersey =

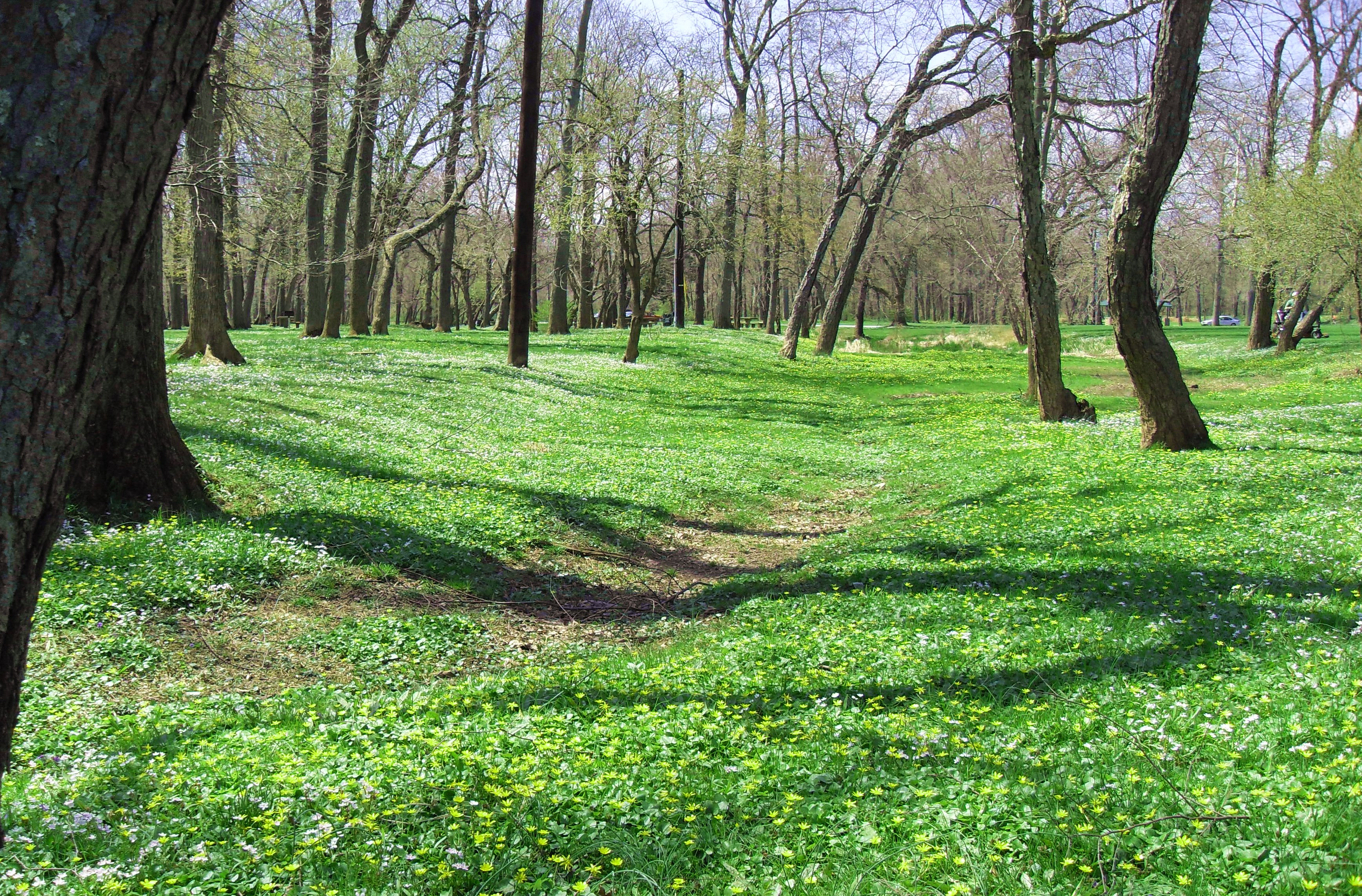
Spring in Duke Island Park showing invasive lesser celandine (Ranunculus ficaria)

Numerous plants have been introduced to the US state of New Jersey in the last four hundred years, and many of them have become invasive species that compete with the native plants and suppress their growth. Duke Farms identified 55 invasive species on its property and investigates methods to control them. Major invaders are:

| Picture | Scientific Name | Common Name |
|---|---|---|
| | Acer platanoides | Norway maple |
| | Ailanthus altissima | tree of heaven |
| | Alliaria petiolata | garlic mustad |
| | Ampelopsis glandulosa | |
| | Aralia elata | Japanese angelica tree |
| | Berberis thunbergii | Japanese barberry |
| | Celastrus orbiculatus | Oriental bittersweet |
| | Centaurea maculosa | spotted knapweed |
| | Cirsium arvense | Canada thistle |
| | Dipsacus fullonum | wild teasel |
| | Elaeagnus umbellata | Japanese silverberry |
| | Euonymus alatus | winged spindle |
| | Lonicera japonica | Japanese honeysuckle |
| | Lonicera maackii | Amur honeysuckle |
| | Lythrum salicaria | purple loosestrife |
| | Microstegium vimineum | Japanese stiltgrass |
| | Miscanthus sinensis | maiden silvergrass |
| | Ranunculus ficaria | lesser celandine |
| | Reynoutria japonica | Asian knotweed |
| | Rhamnus cathartica | buckthorn |
| | Robinia pseudoacacia | black locust |
| | Rosa multiflora | multiflora rose |
| | Rubus phoenicolasius | Japanese wineberry |

== See also ==
- Invasive species in the United States
