= Hillsborough Township, New Jersey =

Township in Somerset County, New Jersey, US

- Township
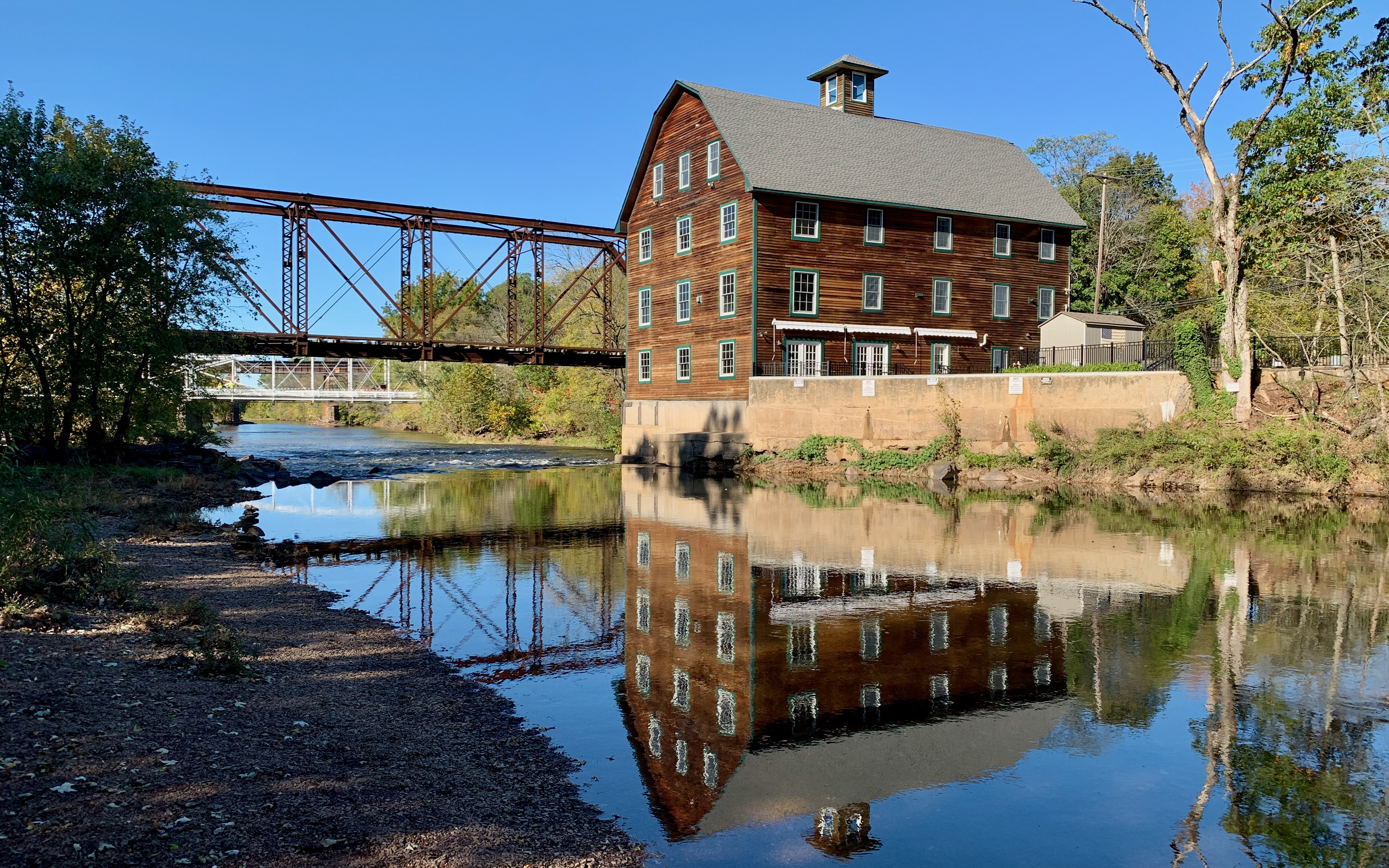
- Neshanic Mills

- Seal

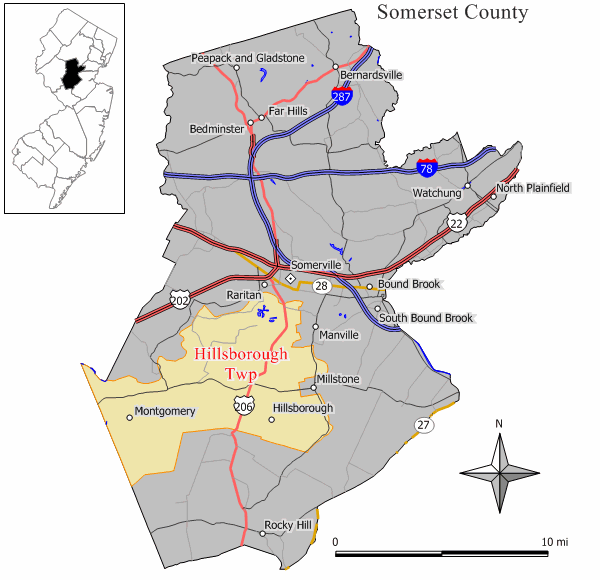
- Location of Hillsborough Township in Somerset County highlighted in yellow (right). Inset map: Location of Somerset County in New Jersey highlighted in black (left).

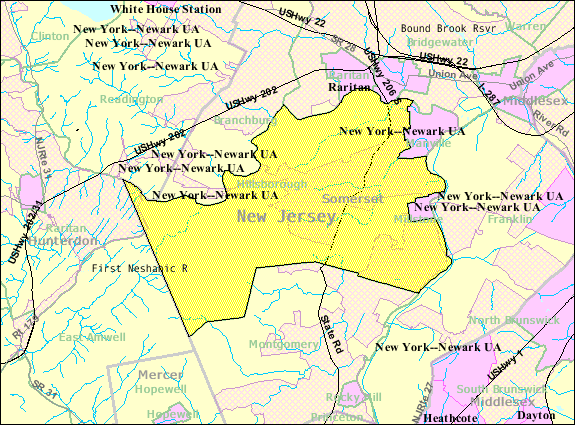
- Census Bureau map of Hillsborough Township, New Jersey

- Location in Somerset County Location in New Jersey Location in the United States
- Coordinates: 40.497692°N 74.670505°W
- Country: United States
- State: New Jersey
- County: Somerset
- Royal charter: September 12, 1771
- Incorporated: February 21, 1798

Government
  - Type: Township
  - Body: Township Council
  - Mayor: Catherine Payne (R)
  - Administrator: Anthony Ferrera
  - Municipal clerk: Sarah Brake

Area
  - Total: 55.10 sq mi (142.71 km^{2})
  - Land: 54.61 sq mi (141.45 km^{2})
  - Water: 0.49 sq mi (1.26 km^{2}) 0.88%
  - Rank: 28th of 565 in state 1st of 21 in county
- Elevation: 108 ft (33 m)

Population (2020)
  - Total: 43,276
  - Estimate (2023): 44,135
  - Rank: 53rd of 565 in state 3rd of 21 in county
  - Density: 792.4/sq mi (305.9/km^{2})
  - Rank: 409th of 565 in state 14th of 21 in county
- Time zone: UTC−05:00 (Eastern (EST))
  - Summer (DST): UTC−04:00 (Eastern (EDT))
- ZIP Code: 08844
- Area codes: 732 and 908
- FIPS code: 3403531890
- GNIS feature ID: 0882169
- Website: hillsboroughnj.gov

Hillsborough Township is a township in Somerset County, in the U.S. state of New Jersey. Located in the Raritan Valley region, the township is a suburban and exurban bedroom community of New York City within the New York Metropolitan Area. As of the 2020 United States census, the township's population was 43,276, an increase of 4,973 (+13.0%) from the 2010 census count of 38,303, which in turn reflected an increase of 1,669 (+4.6%) from the 36,634 counted in the 2000 census.

Hillsborough Township was originally created by royal charter issued May 31, 1771, which was revoked and revised on September 12, 1771. It was incorporated on February 21, 1798 by the New Jersey Legislature Township Act of 1798 as one of New Jersey's original group of 104 townships. Portions of the township were taken to form the boroughs of Millstone (May 14, 1894) and Manville (April 1, 1929). The township's name may have come from an earlier name of "Hillsbury", though it may have been named for Wills Hill, 1st Marquess of Downshire who was the Earl of Hillsborough. Based on an analysis of data from the FBI's Uniform Crime Report for 2022, Hillsborough Township was ranked as the second-safest small city in the United States.

== History ==
On May 31, 1771, Hillsborough was officially granted a Charter incorporating it as a Township. A revised charter was issued on September 12, 1771. The records of Hillsborough Township are complete from their inception in 1746 and there are ten volumes, each some several hundred pages, kept in the Special Collections Department of the Rutgers University Library along with the Charter.

Hillsborough Township quickly took its place in history as the path General George Washington and his troops traveled from the Battle of Princeton to winter quarters in Morristown. While the British were encamped in the valley below awaiting an opportunity to attack, it is said that Washington drilled his troops on the Sourland Mountain around a spring near the top using different formations and corn stalks for guns. As the sun caught the stalks, the British thought Washington had received reinforcements and fresh supplies. The British troops, thinking that they were outnumbered, slipped off to New Brunswick leaving Washington to continue to Morristown.

The township was formally incorporated on February 21, 1798.

Hillsborough is the home of the Belle Mead GSA depot, or Belle Mead General Depot, which was a storage site for materials during World War II, along with housing Italian and German prisoners of war. It continued storing materials until the 1980s, and various contaminants have leaked into the ground and surrounding area during that time. Efforts are under way to convert the site into a mixed recreation and R&D complex.

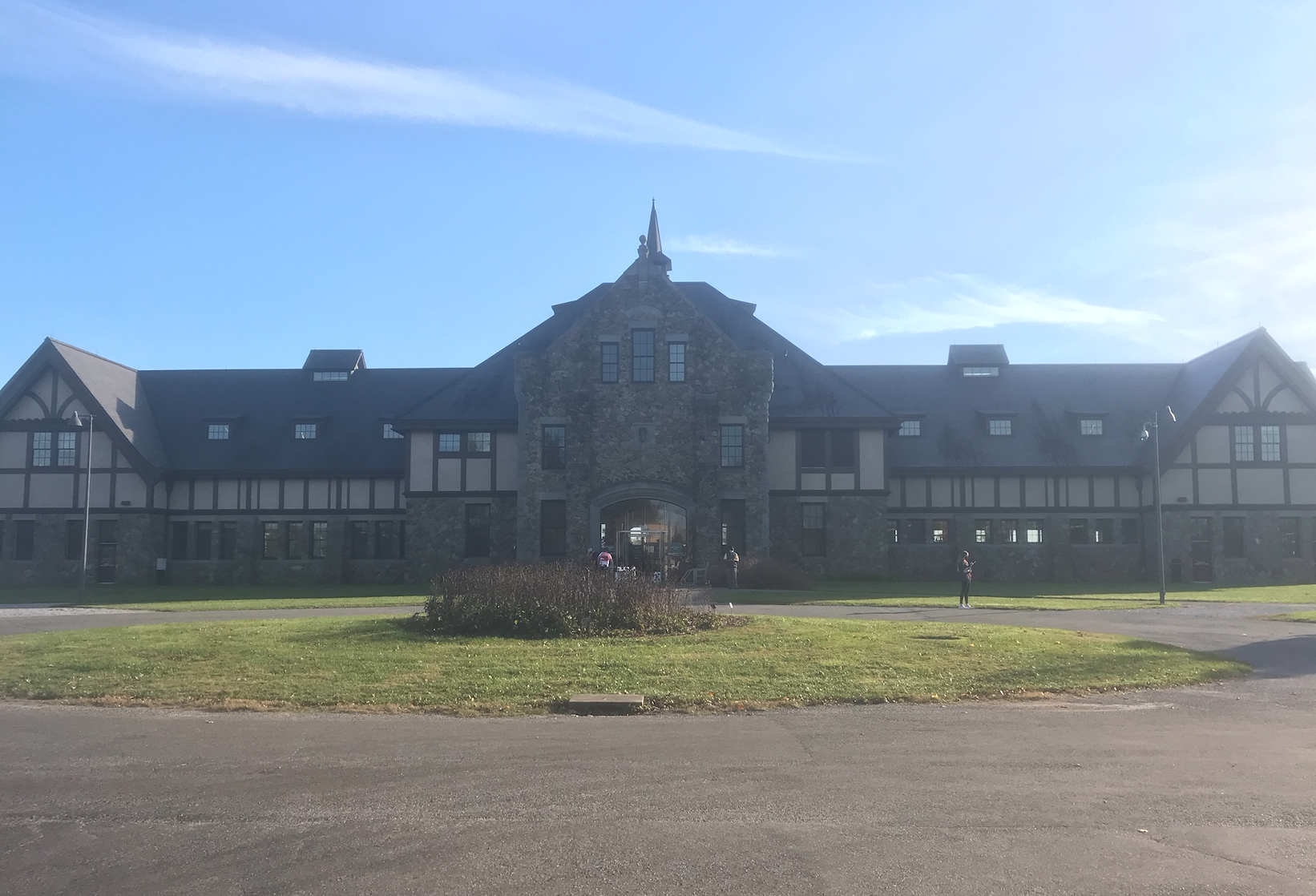
The Manor at Duke Farms, now the park's Orientation Center

Hillsborough is home to Duke Gardens and Duke Farms, a 2,700 acres (11 km^{2}) estate in the north-eastern quadrant of the town that was originally owned by tobacco and electric energy tycoon James "Buck" Duke and then passed down to daughter Doris Duke. As of March 2023, approximately one-third of Hillsborough Township is preserved as Open Space and/or Preserved Farmland.

In Money magazine's 2013 Best Places to Live rankings, Hillsborough was ranked 16th in the nation, the third-highest among the three places in New Jersey included in the top 50 list. In the magazine's 2007 rankings, the township was ranked as the 23rd best place to live in the nation.

== Geography ==
According to the United States Census Bureau, the township had a total area of 55.10 square miles (142.71 km^{2}), including 54.61 square miles (141.45 km^{2}) of land and 0.49 square miles (1.26 km^{2}) of water (0.88%). Nearly 40% of the land is designated as protected or preserved open space.

Unincorporated communities, localities and place names located partially or completely within the township include Amwell, Belle Mead, Blackwells Mills, Champlain, Cloverhill, Clover Mill, Flagtown, Frankfort, Hamilton, Higgins Mills, Hillsborough CDP, Montgomery, Neshanic, Pleasant View, Royce Field, Royce Valley, South Branch, Woods Tavern and Zion.

The township borders Branchburg Township, Bridgewater Township, Franklin Township, Manville, Millstone, Montgomery Township, Raritan and Somerville in Somerset County; and East Amwell Township, Raritan Township and Readington Township in Hunterdon County.

== Ecology ==
According to the A. W. Kuchler U.S. potential natural vegetation types, Hillsborough Township would have an Appalachian Oak (104) vegetation type with an Eastern Hardwood Forest (25) vegetation form.

== Climate ==
The township has a humid subtropical climate (Cfa) if the -3 isotherm is used, consistent with most of Somerset County. The low in January, the coldest month on average, is 18 °F (−8 °C), while the high in July, the warmest month on average, is 85 °F (29 °C).

Climate data for Hillsborough Township, New Jersey
Month	Jan	Feb	Mar	Apr	May	Jun	Jul	Aug	Sep	Oct	Nov	Dec	Year
Record high °F (°C)	74 (23)	76 (24)	86 (30)	94 (34)	99 (37)	101 (38)	104 (40)	105 (41)	105 (41)	92 (33)	84 (29)	73 (23)	105 (41)
Mean daily maximum °F (°C)	39 (4)	41 (5)	50 (10)	61 (16)	72 (22)	80 (27)	85 (29)	83 (28)	76 (24)	64 (18)	54 (12)	42 (6)	62 (17)
Mean daily minimum °F (°C)	18 (−8)	20 (−7)	27 (−3)	36 (2)	46 (8)	56 (13)	61 (16)	60 (16)	52 (11)	40 (4)	31 (−1)	23 (−5)	39 (4)
Record low °F (°C)	−16 (−27)	−12 (−24)	−1 (−18)	16 (−9)	26 (−3)	34 (1)	44 (7)	38 (3)	29 (−2)	12 (−11)	5 (−15)	−10 (−23)	−16 (−27)
Average precipitation inches (mm)	3.59 (91)	2.84 (72)	3.94 (100)	4.09 (104)	4.33 (110)	4.35 (110)	4.83 (123)	3.98 (101)	4.26 (108)	4.21 (107)	3.59 (91)	3.84 (98)	47.85 (1,215)

== Demographics ==
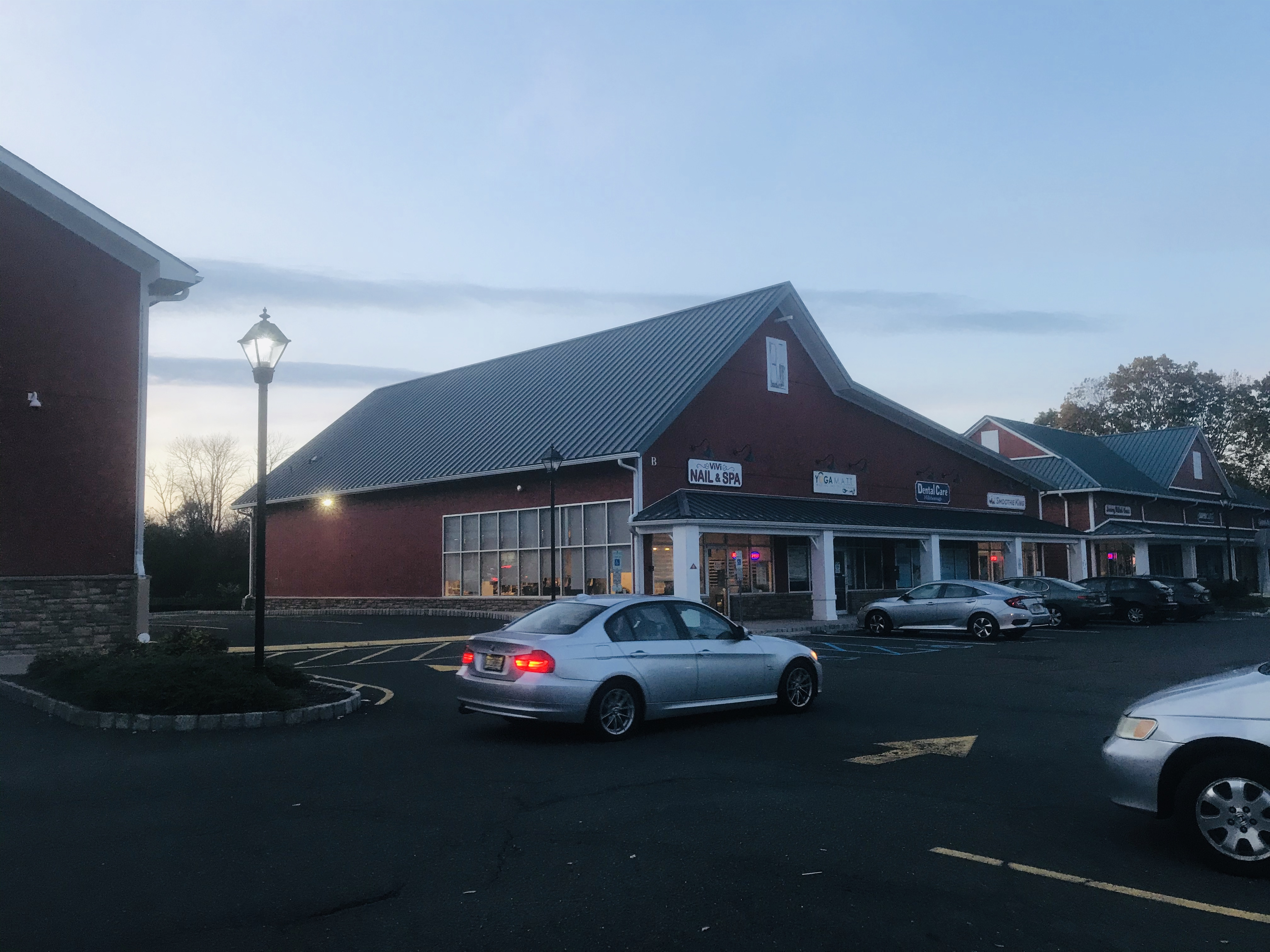
Shopping plaza in Hillsborough

Historical population
Census	Pop.	Note	%±
1790	2,201		—
1810	2,456		—
1820	2,885		17.5%
1830	2,878		−0.2%
1840	2,863		−0.5%
1850	3,409		19.1%
1860	3,488		2.3%
1870	3,443		−1.3%
1880	3,248		−5.7%
1890	2,825		−13.0%
1900	2,439	*	−13.7%
1910	2,313		−5.2%
1920	5,124		121.5%
1930	2,283	*	−55.4%
1940	2,645		15.9%
1950	3,875		46.5%
1960	7,584		95.7%
1970	11,061		45.8%
1980	19,061		72.3%
1990	28,808		51.1%
2000	36,634		27.2%
2010	38,303		4.6%
2020	43,276		13.0%
2023 (est.)	44,135	▲	2.0%
Population sources: 1790–1920 1840 1850–1870; 1850 1870 1880–1890; 1890–1910 1910–1930; 1940–2000 2000; 2010 2020 * = Lost territory in previous decade.

=== 2010 census ===
The 2010 United States census counted 38,303 people, 13,573 households, and 10,424 families in the township. The population density was 702.3 per square mile (271.2/km^{2}). There were 14,030 housing units at an average density of 257.3 per square mile (99.3/km^{2}). The racial makeup was 78.61% (30,109) White, 4.59% (1,757) Black or African American, 0.12% (46) Native American, 12.38% (4,743) Asian, 0.04% (15) Pacific Islander, 2.18% (834) from other races, and 2.09% (799) from two or more races. Hispanic or Latino residents of any race were 7.55% (2,893) of the population.

Of the 13,573 households, 40.3% had children under the age of 18; 65.7% were married couples living together; 8.3% had a female householder with no husband present and 23.2% were non-families. Of all households, 19.0% were made up of individuals and 6.3% had someone living alone who was 65 years of age or older. The average household size was 2.81 and the average family size was 3.25.

26.4% of the population was under the age of 18, 6.5% was from 18 to 24, 25.6% from 25 to 44, 32.2% from 45 to 64, and 9.3% was 65 years of age or older. The median age was 39.9 years. For every 100 females, the population had 95.0 males. For every 100 females ages 18 and older there were 91.4 males.

The Census Bureau's 2006–2010 American Community Survey showed that (in 2010 inflation-adjusted dollars) median household income was $105,429 (with a margin of error of +/− $2,892) and the median family income was $119,750 (+/− $2,852). Males had a median income of $81,807 (+/− $5,320) versus $52,366 (+/− $1,804) for females. The per capita income for the borough was $43,029 (+/− $1,701). About 0.8% of families and 1.6% of the population were below the poverty line, including 1.1% of those under age 18 and 4.0% of those age 65 or over.

=== 2000 census ===
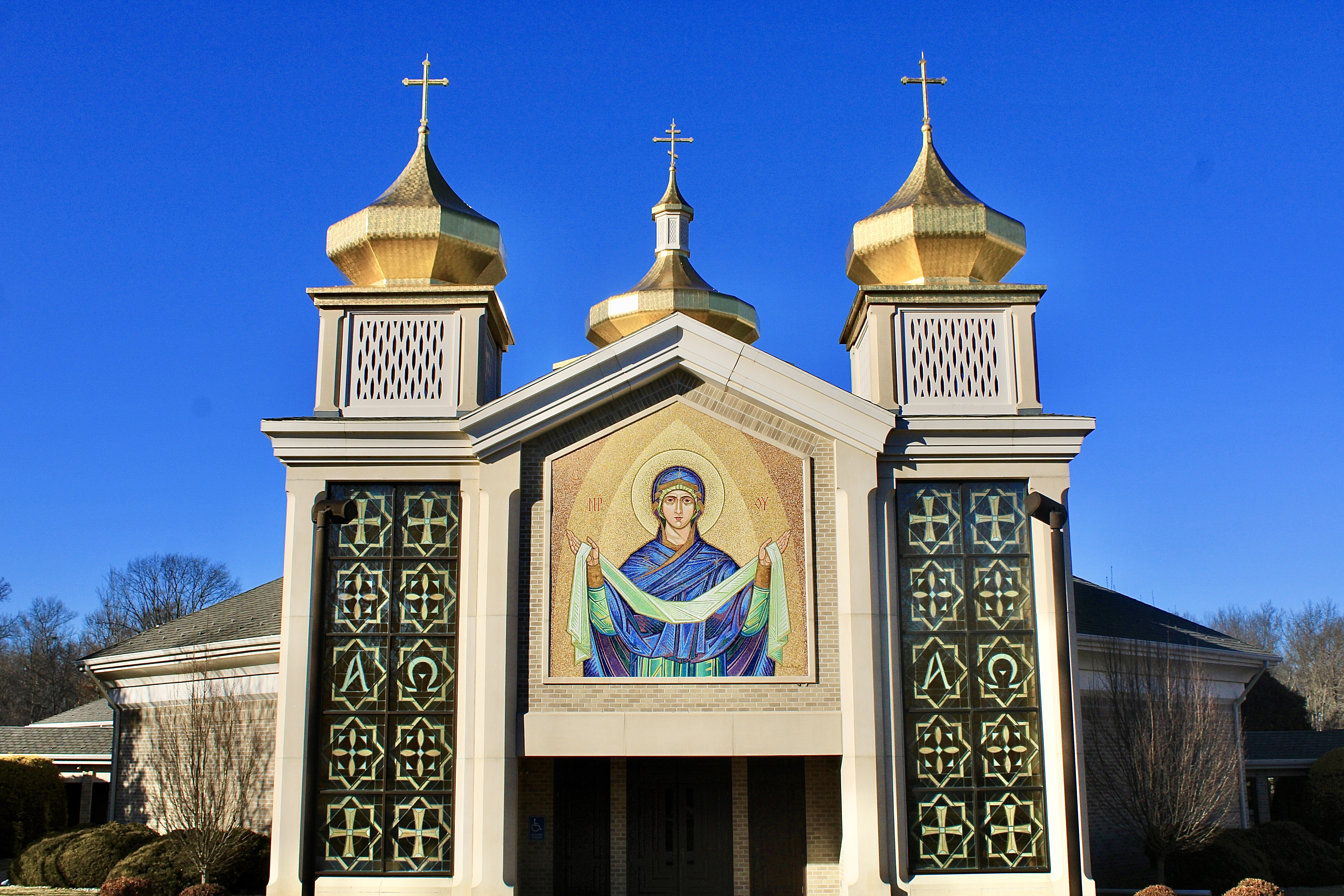
St. Mary Byzantine Catholic Church in the northern portion of Hillsborough

As of the 2000 United States census there were 36,634 people, 12,649 households, and 9,802 families residing in the township. The population density was 669.9 inhabitants per square mile (258.6/km^{2}). There were 12,854 housing units at an average density of 235.0 per square mile (90.7/km^{2}). The racial makeup of the township was 85.96% White, 7.31% Asian, 3.76% African American, 0.09% American Indian, 0.06% Pacific Islander, 1.28% from other races, and 1.53% from two or more races. Hispanic or Latino residents of any race were 4.75% of the population.

There were 12,649 households, out of which 44.9% had children under the age of 18 living with them . said– 67.6% were married couples living together, 7.5% had a female householder with no husband present, and 22.5% were non-families. 17.8% of all households were made up of individuals, and 4.0% had someone living alone who was 65 years of age or older. The average household size was 2.88, and the average family size was 3.31.

In the township, 29.1% of the population was under the age of 18, 6.0% was from 18 to 24, 34.7% from 25 to 44, 23.3% from 45 to 64, and 6.8% was 65 years of age or older. The median age was 36 years. For every 100 females, there were 97.6 males. For every 100 females age 18 and over, there were 93.1 males.

The median income for a household in the township was $83,290, and the median income for a family was $93,933. Males had a median income of $62,273 versus $42,052 for females. The per capita income for the township was $33,091. About 2.1% of families and 3.1% of the population were below the poverty line, including 3.6% of those under age 18 and 3.5% of those age 65 or over.

== Parks and recreation ==
Hillsborough is home to numerous parks and nature trails, operated by both the township and the Somerset County Park Commission, including; Ann Van Middlesworth Park, Mountain View Park, Woodfield Park, Sunnymeade Run Playground, Doyle Park - Mike Merdinger Memorial Trail, Sourland Mountain Preserve, and Sourland Mountain Hiking Trail.

=== Duke Farms ===
Duke Farms is an estate that was established by James Buchanan Duke, an American entrepreneur who founded Duke Power and the American Tobacco Company. The property is managed by the Doris Duke Foundation after the death of Doris Duke, the second owner. After extensive reorganization and an investment of $45 million, "Duke Farms" was opened to the public on May 19, 2012. Duke Farms is owned by the Duke Farms Foundation (DFF) that was established in 1998 to manage the estate. The Foundation, in turn, is part of the Doris Duke Charitable Foundation, and the two entities share a common board and leadership team.

==== Duke Gardens ====
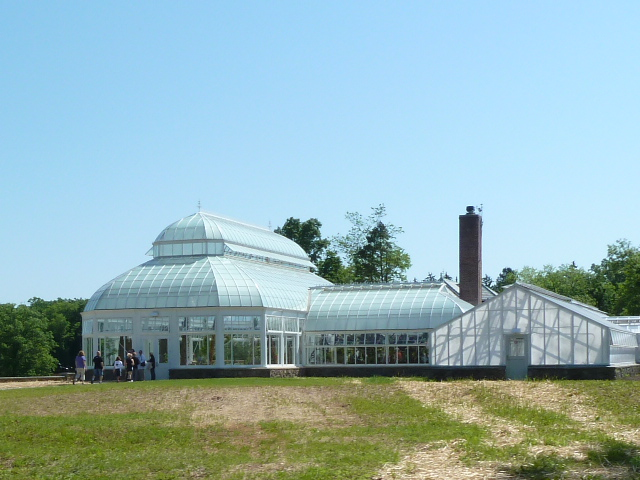
The Orchid Range

Despite some controversy for when the commission made the decision to permanently close Duke Gardens, demolishing the indoor display gardens that had been created by Doris Duke, the commission has made strides in contributing to renovating the property for the 21st century. The DFF over the years have created new indoor and outdoor display gardens that are eco-friendly, use native plants, and are wheelchair accessible. In the process of rehabilitation numerous invasive foreign plants were removed including Norwegian maple and Asian Ailanthus and replaced by native species. On May 19, 2012, Duke Farms opened to the public. After a $45-million renovation, Duke Farms now include 30 endangered species and 230 varieties of birds, among which are the great blue heron and the bald eagle. As part of the rehabilitation, the conservatory and greenhouses known as the Orchid Range were renovated to became more energy-efficient.

== Government ==
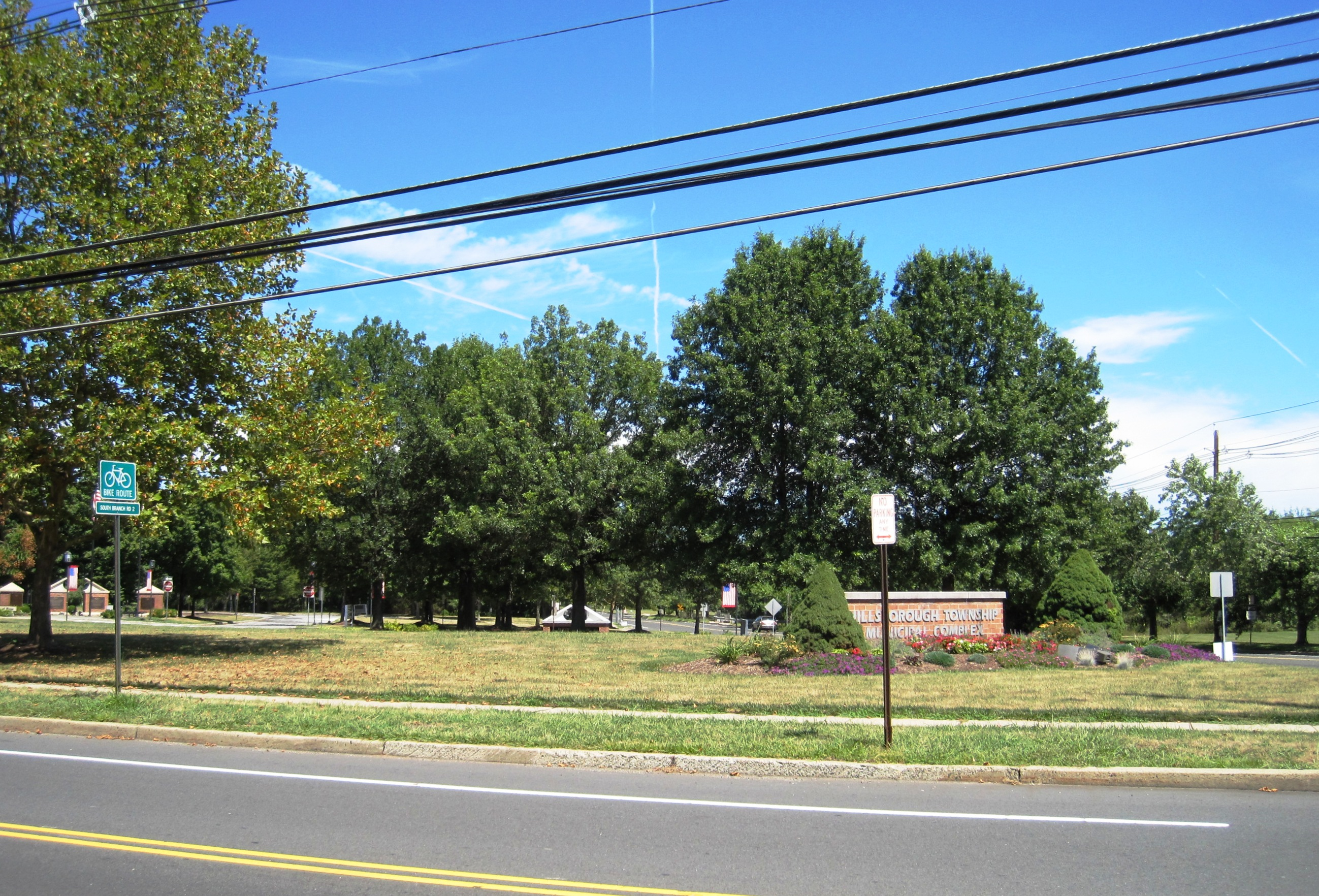
Hillsborough Municipal Complex

=== Local government ===
Hillsborough Township is governed under the Township form of New Jersey municipal government, one of 141 municipalities (of the 564) statewide that use this form, the second-most commonly used form of government in the state. The Township Committee is comprised of five members, who are elected directly by the voters at-large in partisan elections to serve three-year terms of office on a staggered basis, with either one or two seats coming up for election each year as part of the November general election in a three-year cycle. The mayor and deputy mayor are chosen by the Township Committee from among its members at an annual reorganization meeting, each serving a one-year term.

As of 2026, members of the Hillsborough Township Committee are Mayor Catherine Payne (R, term on committee and term as mayor end December 31, 2026), Deputy Mayor Shawn Lipani (R, term on committee ends December 31, 2027; term as deputy mayor ends December 31, 2026), Robert Britting Jr. (R, term ends 2027), Samantha Hand (D, 2026), and Jill Gomez (D, 2028).

In March 2022, the Township Committee selected Robert Britting Jr. from a list of three names nominated by the Republican municipal committee to fill the seat expiring in December 2024 that had been held by Steven Cohen until he stepped down from office due to COVID-19-related health issues. Britting served on an interim basis until the November 2022 general election, when voters will choose a candidate to serve the balance of the term of office.

In March 2021, the Township Committee chose Democrat Jeffrey Wright from three candidates listed by the local Democratic committee to fill the seat expiring in December 2021 that had been held by Olivia Holmes, who had resigned the previous month due to COVID related issues.

Based on the results of a Charter Study Commission, a recommendation was listed on the November 2007 general election ballot proposing that the township adopt a Mayor-Council form of government under the Faulkner Act. At the election, 58% of those voting rejected the proposed change, leaving Hillsborough's traditional township form of government unchanged.

=== Federal, state, and county representation ===
Hillsborough Township is located in the 7th and 12th Congressional Districts and is part of New Jersey's 16th state legislative district.

For the 119th United States Congress, New Jersey's 7th congressional district is represented by Thomas Kean Jr. (R, Westfield). For the 119th United States Congress, New Jersey's 12th congressional district is represented by Bonnie Watson Coleman (D, Ewing Township). New Jersey is represented in the United States Senate by Democrats Cory Booker (Newark, term ends 2027) and Andy Kim (Moorestown, term ends 2031).

For the 2026–2027 session, the 16th legislative district of the New Jersey Legislature is represented in the New Jersey Senate by Andrew Zwicker (D, South Brunswick) and in the General Assembly by Mitchelle Drulis (D, East Amwell Township) and Roy Freiman (D, Hillsborough Township).

Somerset County is governed by a five-member Board of County Commissioners, whose members are elected at-large to three-year terms of office on a staggered basis, with one or two seats coming up for election each year. At an annual reorganization meeting held in the first week of January, the board selects a Director and deputy director from among its members. As of 2025, Somerset County's County Commissioners are Director Shanel Robinson (D, Franklin Township, term as commissioner ends 2027; term as director ends 2026), Deputy Director Paul Drake (D, Hillsborough Township, term as commissioner and as deputy director ends 2026), Melonie Marano (D, Green Brook Township, 2028), Elizabeth Graner (D, Bernards Township, 2026; elected to serve an unexpired term) and Sara Sooy (D, Bedminster Township, 2027).

Constitutional officers, elected on a countywide basis are Clerk Steve Peter (D, Somerville, 2027), Sheriff Darrin Russo (D, Franklin Township, 2028) and Surrogate Bernice "Tina" Jalloh (D, Franklin Township, 2030).

=== Politics ===
As of March 2011, there were a total of 24,841 registered voters in Hillsborough Township, of which 5,575 (22.4% vs. 26.0% countywide) were registered as Democrats, 5,507 (22.2% vs. 25.7%) were registered as Republicans and 13,745 (55.3% vs. 48.2%) were registered as Unaffiliated. There were 14 voters registered as Libertarians or Greens. Among the township's 2010 Census population, 64.9% (vs. 60.4% in Somerset County) were registered to vote, including 88.1% of those ages 18 and over (vs. 80.4% countywide).

United States presidential election results for Hillsborough Township
Year	Republican		Democratic		Third party(ies)	
Year	No.	%	No.	%	No.	%
2024	10,487	44.40%	12,545	53.11%	590	2.50%
2020	10,349	42.24%	13,927	56.85%	223	0.91%
2016	9,354	45.65%	10,276	50.15%	859	4.19%
2012	8,842	48.55%	9,071	49.80%	301	1.65%
2008	9,218	48.58%	9,507	50.10%	250	1.32%
2004	9,246	53.18%	7,965	45.81%	176	1.01%
2000	6,994	49.69%	6,606	46.94%	474	3.37%

In the 2012 presidential election, Democrat Barack Obama received 49.8% of the vote (9,071 cast), ahead of Republican Mitt Romney with 48.5% (8,842 votes), and other candidates with 1.7% (301 votes), among the 18,319 ballots cast by the township's 26,570 registered voters (105 ballots were spoiled), for a turnout of 68.9%. In the 2008 presidential election, Democrat Barack Obama received 9,507 votes (49.8% vs. 52.1% countywide), ahead of Republican John McCain with 9,218 votes (48.2% vs. 46.1%) and other candidates with 250 votes (1.3% vs. 1.1%), among the 19,107 ballots cast by the township's 23,926 registered voters, for a turnout of 79.9% (vs. 78.7% in Somerset County). In the 2004 presidential election, Republican George W. Bush received 9,246 votes (53.0% vs. 51.5% countywide), ahead of Democrat John Kerry with 7,965 votes (45.7% vs. 47.2%) and other candidates with 176 votes (1.0% vs. 0.9%), among the 17,433 ballots cast by the township's 21,152 registered voters, for a turnout of 82.4% (vs. 81.7% in the whole county).

Gubernatorial election results for Hillsborough Township
Year	Republican		Democratic		Third party(ies)	
Year	No.	%	No.	%	No.	%
2025	8,162	42.96%	10,710	56.37%	126	0.66%
2021	8,176	52.08%	7,451	47.46%	71	0.45%
2017	6,109	50.59%	5,714	47.32%	253	2.10%
2013	7,855	69.25%	3,298	29.08%	190	1.68%
2009	7,436	60.24%	3,765	30.50%	1,142	9.25%
2005	6,452	55.06%	4,714	40.23%	553	4.72%

In the 2013 gubernatorial election, Republican Chris Christie received 69.2% of the vote (7,855 cast), ahead of Democrat Barbara Buono with 29.1% (3,298 votes), and other candidates with 1.7% (190 votes), among the 11,493 ballots cast by the township's 26,883 registered voters (150 ballots were spoiled), for a turnout of 42.8%. In the 2009 gubernatorial election, Republican Chris Christie received 7,436 votes (59.9% vs. 55.8% countywide), ahead of Democrat Jon Corzine with 3,765 votes (30.3% vs. 34.1%), Independent Chris Daggett with 1,046 votes (8.4% vs. 8.7%) and other candidates with 96 votes (0.8% vs. 0.7%), among the 12,416 ballots cast by the township's 24,456 registered voters, yielding a 50.8% turnout (vs. 52.5% in the county).

United States Senate election results for Hillsborough Township1
Year	Republican		Democratic		Third party(ies)	
Year	No.	%	No.	%	No.	%
2024	10,285	44.88%	12,095	52.77%	539	2.35%
2018	8,374	49.17%	8,026	47.13%	629	3.69%
2012	8,599	49.48%	8,355	48.07%	426	2.45%
2006	5,569	51.02%	4,934	45.20%	413	3.78%

United States Senate election results for Hillsborough Township2
Year	Republican		Democratic		Third party(ies)	
Year	No.	%	No.	%	No.	%
2020	11,074	45.37%	13,039	53.42%	297	1.22%
2014	4,893	52.40%	4,245	45.46%	200	2.14%
2013	3,534	52.54%	3,144	46.74%	48	0.71%
2008	9,542	53.32%	7,852	43.87%	503	2.81%

== Education ==
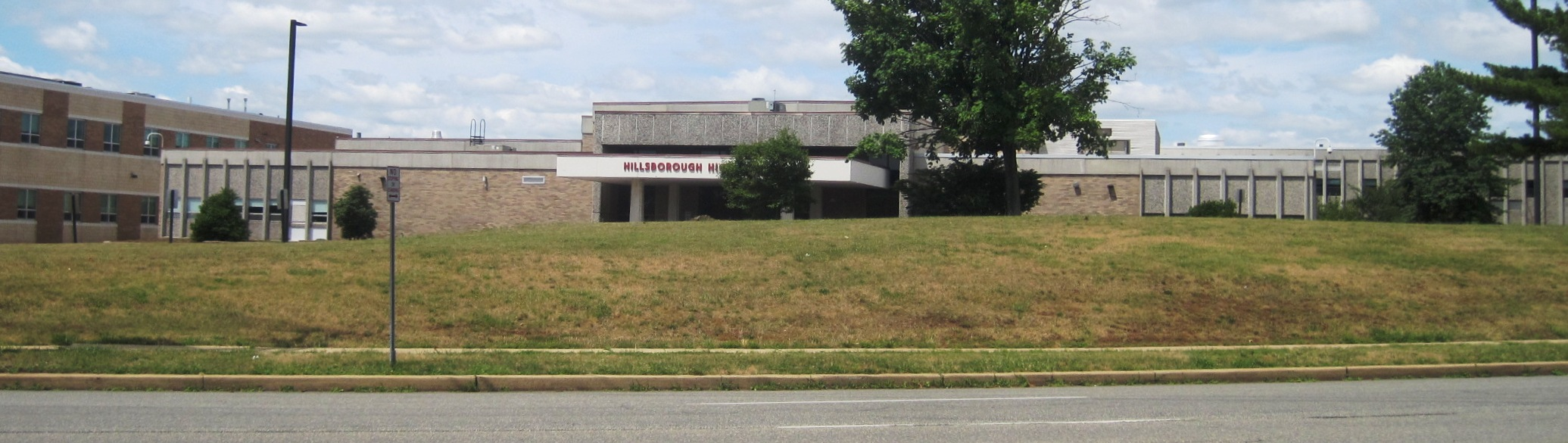
Hillsborough High School, located on the corner of Amwell Road and Raider Boulevard

The Hillsborough Township School District serves students in pre-kindergarten through twelfth grade. Students from Millstone attend the district's schools, originally as part of a sending/receiving relationship; the New Jersey Commissioner of Education merged Millstone's non-operating school district with the Hillsborough Township School District effective July 1, 2009. As of the 2020–21 school year, the district, comprised of nine schools, had an enrollment of 7,288 students and 596.6 classroom teachers (on an FTE basis), for a student–teacher ratio of 12.2:1. Schools in the district (with 2020–21 enrollment data from the National Center for Education Statistics) are Amsterdam Elementary School (456 students; in grades K–4), Hillsborough Elementary School (488; K–4), Sunnymead Elementary School (495; K–4), Triangle Elementary School (354; K–4), Woodfern Elementary School (354; K–4), Woods Road Elementary School (421; Pre-K–4), Auten Road Intermediate School (1,143; 5–6), Hillsborough Middle School (1,218; 7–8) and Hillsborough High School (2,318; 9–12).

== Transportation ==
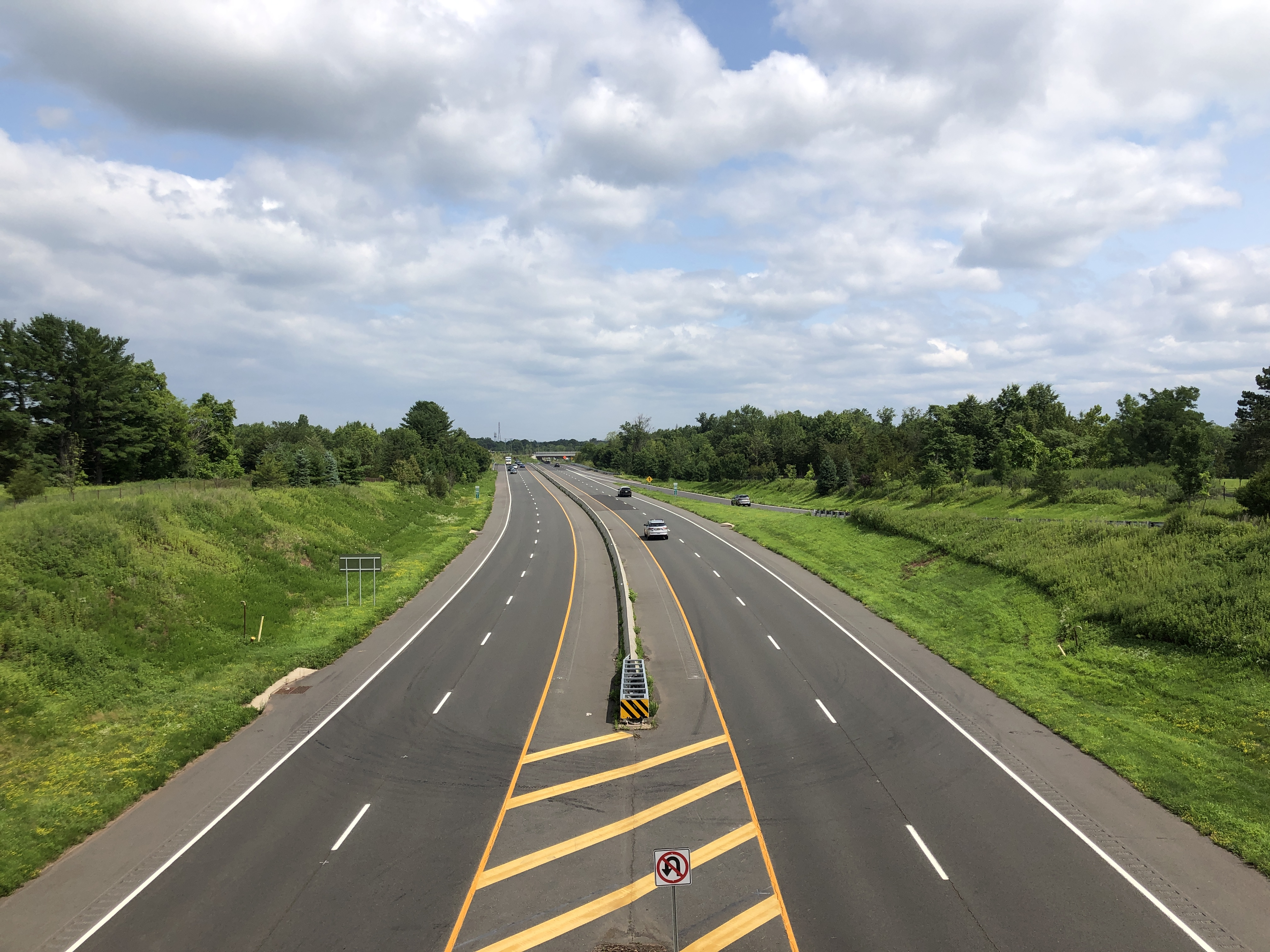
US 206 Bypass in Hillsborough

=== Roads and highways ===
As of May 2010, the township had a total of 211.92 miles (341.05 km) of roadways, of which 185.42 miles (298.40 km) were maintained by the municipality, 19.79 miles (31.85 km) by Somerset County and 6.71 miles (10.80 km) by the New Jersey Department of Transportation.

U.S. Route 206 is the main road that passes through the township. Construction of a new alignment of US 206, the 3.75-mile (6.04 km) US 206 Bypass began in 2010 to bypass the congested stretch of the road. Built in two phases, the first 1.66-mile (2.67 km) phase, between Hillsborough and Amwell Roads, was opened in October 2013. The second phase was originally expected to be completed by 2015, but was delayed multiple times due to a lack of state funding. Construction finally resumed in 2017 and the roadway was completed in 2021. The road is named for Peter J. Biondi, a former Hillsborough mayor and member of the General Assembly.

Now that construction of the Bypass is completed, the intention is for the existing US-206 to become a downtown "main street" for the township and be zoned for commercial and residential use.

Main county roads that pass through are CR 514 which runs for 10.24 miles (16.48 km) through the township, and CR 533. Interstate 287 is outside the municipality in bordering Bridgewater and Franklin Townships. Part of the proposed routing of Interstate 95 through central New Jersey included Hillsborough; this project was ultimately canceled in the 1980s.

=== Rail ===
NJ Transit has proposed a new West Trenton Line that would stretch for 27 miles (43 km) from the West Trenton station in Ewing Township to a connection with the Raritan Valley Line at Bridgewater Township, and from there to Newark Penn Station in Newark. The plan would include stations at both Belle Mead and Hillsborough. The plan was canceled due to lack of funding and NJ Transit has no plans to restore the project.

The Norfolk Southern Railway's Lehigh Line (formerly the mainline of the Lehigh Valley Railroad), runs through Hillsborough Township.

=== Bus ===
Hillsborough is served by D.H.I.L.A.N buses, providing service to Manville, Bridgewater Township and Somerville, with service continuing to Bedminster during rush hour.

Coach USA offers weekday express service across 42nd Street to the United Nations in Midtown Manhattan from Hillsborough operated by Suburban Transit. There are four morning buses Monday through Friday with a reduced schedule on some Holidays.

== Notable people ==
People who were born in, residents of, or otherwise closely associated with Hillsborough Township include:

- Lori Alhadeff (born 1975), member of the Broward County School Board who founded a gun control-promoting organization after her daughter Alyssa died in the Stoneman Douglas High School shooting
- John Bell, former radio DJ on Z100 WHTZ Elvis Duran and the Z Morning Zoo
- Brad Benson (born 1955), former New York Giants offensive lineman from 1977 to 1987, owner of Rainbow Run Farm
- Peter J. Biondi (1942–2011), politician who served in the New Jersey General Assembly and was Mayor of Hillsborough from 1986 to 1993
- Michael Ian Black (born 1971), actor, comedian, member of The State and Stella
- Jeannette Brown (born 1934), organic medicinal chemist, historian and author
- Jack Ciattarelli (born 1961), politician who served in the New Jersey General Assembly and was the Republican nominee in the 2017, 2021, and 2025 New Jersey gubernatorial elections.
- Jyotirmoy Datta (born 1936), Bengali writer, journalist, poet and essayist
- Doris Duke (1912–1993), heiress and philanthropist
- Roy Freiman (born 1959), politician who has represented the 16th Legislative District in the New Jersey General Assembly since 2018
- Jessica Galli (born 1983), female wheelchair racing athlete
- Eugene Harvey, Magic: The Gathering player
- Daria Hazuda, biochemist and discoverer of HIV Integrase strand transfer inhibitors
- Abraham Hoagland (1797–1872), early Mormon leader, pioneer, and one of the founders of Royal Oak, Michigan, and Salt Lake City, Utah
- Jaheim (born 1978), R&B singer
- Joe Lis (1946–2010, class of 1964), Major League Baseball player
- Adam Mamawala (born 1987), stand-up comic
- Shawn Mayer (born 1979), NFL safety who played for the New England Patriots and Cleveland Browns
- Shaun O'Hara (born 1977), NFL center who played for the New York Giants
- Ricky Proehl (born 1968), NFL wide receiver who has played for the Indianapolis Colts and is currently the wide receiver coach of the Carolina Panthers
- Dustin Sheppard (born 1980), MLS forward who played for the MetroStars
- Elliott F. Smith (1931–1987), politician who served in the New Jersey General Assembly from 1978 to 1984, where he represented the 16th Legislative District
- Yannick Smith (born 1990), professional soccer forward
- Rich Vos (born 1957), comedian
- Peter Dumont Vroom (1791–1873), 9th Governor of New Jersey
