= Arts and Sciences at Washington University in St. Louis =

Schools at Washington University in St. Louis

Coordinates: 38°38′56.4″N 90°18′39.2″W

Arts and Sciences at Washington University
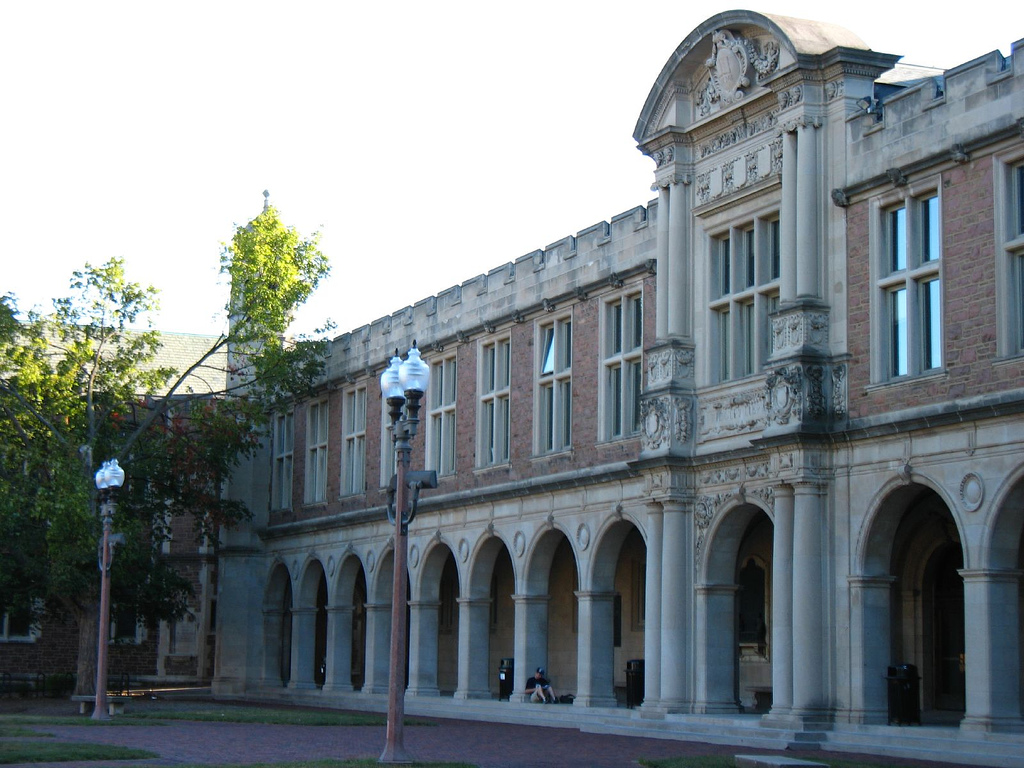
- Type: Private
- Established: 1853; 173 years ago
- Parent institution: Washington University in St. Louis
- Dean: Feng Sheng Hu
- Faculty: 600
- Undergraduates: 3,788
- Postgraduates: 1,589
- Location: St. Louis, Missouri, USA
- Campus: Suburban
- Website: artsci.washu.edu

Arts and Sciences at Washington University in St. Louis is home to the College of Arts and Sciences and corresponding graduate programs across its many departments. The current dean of the faculty is Feng Sheng Hu, the Lucille P. Markey Distinguished Professor in Arts and Sciences.

Arts and Sciences students have a strong track record in national and international fellowship competitions. For example, of Washington University's eleven Fulbright Scholarship recipients in 2011, seven were recent alumni of the College of Arts and Sciences, and three were Arts and Sciences graduate students. In addition, two students were selected as Rhodes Scholars in 2017–2018 and another student was a Rhodes Scholarship finalist in 2016.

== College of Arts and Sciences ==
The College of Arts and Sciences is the central undergraduate unit of the university with 387 tenured and tenure-track faculty, 158 non-tenure track faculty (including lecturers, artists-in-residence, and visiting faculty), and 70 research scientists, serving about 4,000 undergraduates in 40 academic departments and programs divided into divisions of Humanities, Social Sciences, Natural Sciences, Fine Arts, and Mathematics. The College of Arts and Sciences is the largest undergraduate unit at Washington University, ranked 16th amongst national universities by the U.S. News & World Report. The College Office is currently led by Vice Dean of Undergraduate Affairs Erin McGlothlin.

Undergraduates in the other schools meet general education requirements by taking courses in the College of Arts and Sciences. Many of these students have double majors or minors in an Arts and Sciences discipline and in their professional field.

The Integrated Inquiry Curriculum, or IQ Curriculum, is mandatory for Arts and Sciences students. It aims to help students map out their academic path through emphasis on “Core Skills”, such as writing, numeracy, and social thought, as well as the traditional liberal arts, including: the humanities, natural sciences, social and behavioral sciences, and language and cultural diversity.

Undergraduates at the university are encouraged to participate in faculty research. Research is available in all areas of study in Arts and Sciences, and is available to students as early as their freshman year. An Undergraduate Research Journal is published every semester, featuring the most outstanding projects from undergraduates. The Office of Undergraduate Research helps students find research opportunities that match their interests. Undergraduates can also apply for grants and awards from the university, which may be used towards their research endeavors.

James E. McLeod (born 1944) led the College of Arts and Sciences from 1992 to 2011. McLeod had also served the university as Vice Chancellor for Students since 1995. He died September 7, 2011, of cancer.

== Graduate programs ==
The graduate programs in Arts and Sciences serve over 1,500 students pursuing master's and Ph.D. degrees. Some of its many notable programs include Political Science, Creative Writing, Psychology, American and English Literature, Theater and Performance Studies, and the interdisciplinary degree in Philosophy-Neurosciences-Psychology.
