= J. Harper Smith Mansion =

- U.S. National Register of Historic Places
- New Jersey Register of Historic Places
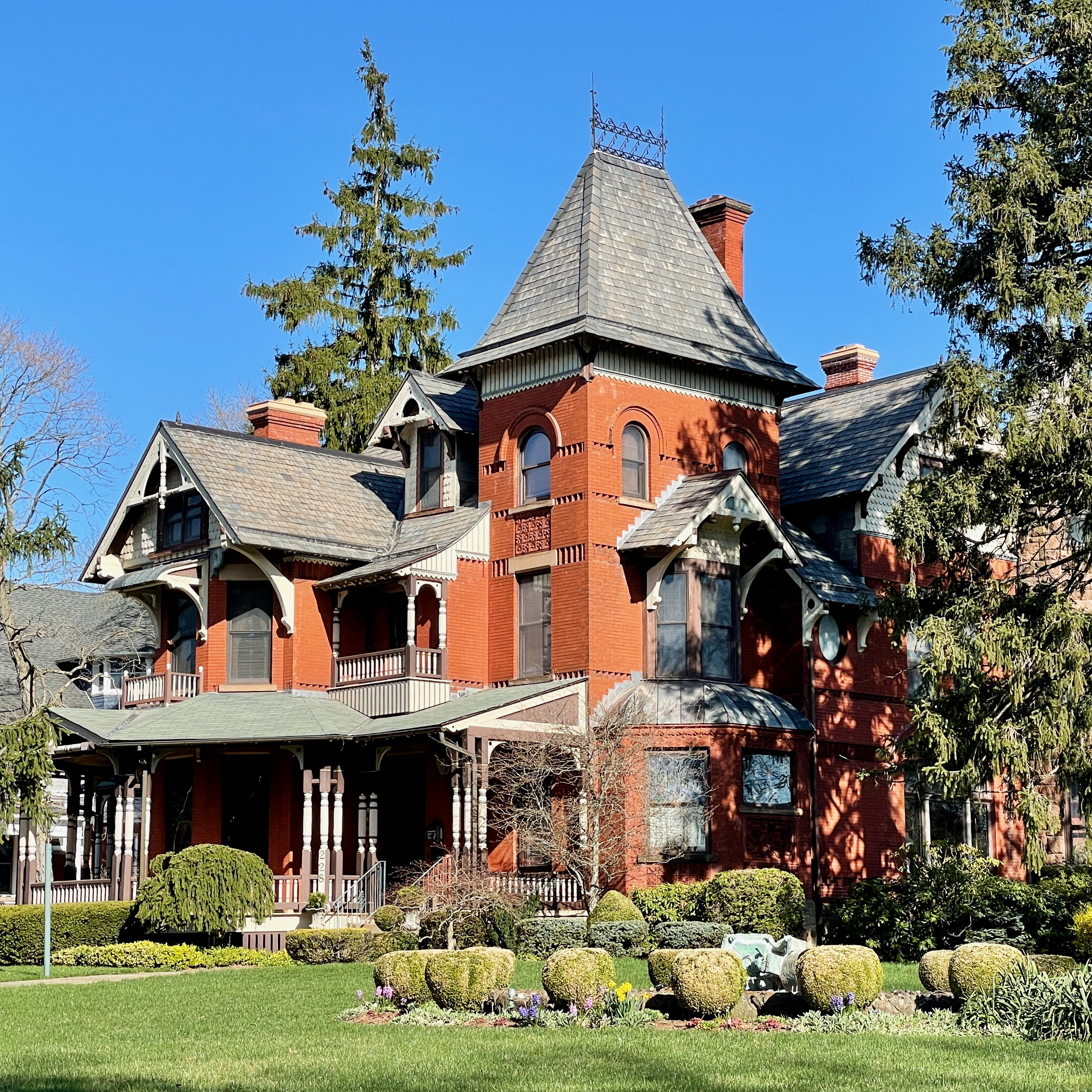
- J. Harper Smith Mansion in 2021

- Location within Somerset County, New Jersey Location within New Jersey Location within the United States
- Location: 228 Altamont Place, Somerville, New Jersey
- Coordinates: 40°34′29″N 74°37′14.3″W
- Built: 1880
- Architect: Frank L. Bodine; Horace Trumbauer
- Architectural style: Queen Anne, Stick/Eastlake, Richardsonian Romanesque
- NRHP reference No.: 98001572
- NJRHP No.: 130

Significant dates
- Added to NRHP: December 31, 1998
- Designated NJRHP: November 24, 1998

The J. Harper Smith Mansion is a historic Late Victorian house built in 1880 by James Harper Smith and located at 228 Altamont Place in the borough of Somerville in Somerset County, New Jersey, in the United States. The architect Horace Trumbauer designed the library addition in 1898. The privately owned residence was added to the National Register of Historic Places on December 31, 1998, for its significance in architecture from 1880 to 1911.

== James Harper Smith ==
James Harper Smith (1834–1911) was a wealthy Somerville businessman. He went to work in the woolen mills in Rockville, Connecticut, as a teenager and rose to superintendent, later becoming known as "Super Smith". He received several patents for inventing mill improvements. In 1869, he moved to the borough of Raritan, New Jersey, and became the superintendent of the Raritan Woolen Mills, growing the business from 33 to 1,200 employees. In 1880, he left Raritan and moved to Somerville to construct a new home. To encourage upscale development of the neighborhood, Smith had the street leading to his Victorian mansion renamed to have a "higher tone", changing it from West Cliff to Altamont Place. In 1894, he was the primary donor of Somerville's St. John's Episcopal Church, contributing US$5,000 (equivalent to $186,000 in 2025) to the building fund. Smith died at his home on December 25, 1911, and is buried at the Somerville New Cemetery.

== The mansion ==
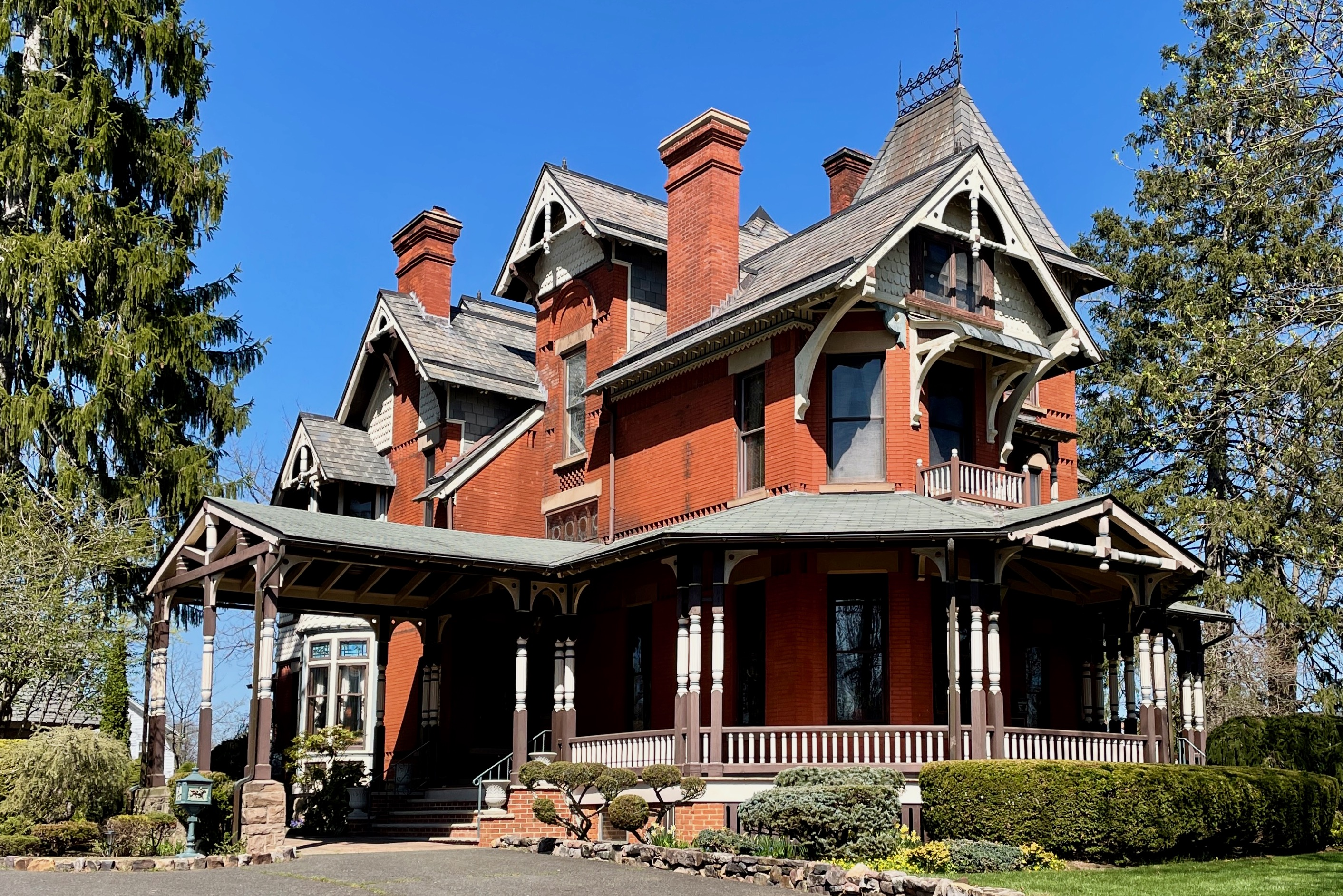
View of porch and porte-cochère

The three-story Smith mansion features Queen Anne architecture with Stick/Eastlake details. Built of brick and stone, the multi-gabled structure has two prominent towers, and is roofed in slate. A wrap-around porch connects to a porte-cochère. The interior features stained-glass windows from Tiffany Studios and decorative terracotta panels. Rich walnut, cherry, oak, ash, and mahogany woods are used to enhance the style of the rooms. One addition was designed by Frank L. Bodine, architect of the Richardsonian Romanesque Somerville station. In 1898, the architect Horace Trumbauer designed the library addition in the style of the Late Renaissance monarch Henry IV of France. As historian Ursula C. Brecknell asserts: "The J. Harper Smith Mansion stands as an excellent example of the taste of a self-made man who became wealthy through his talents and his industry. Architecture was his status symbol, and he chose a lavish style."

The NRHP listing also includes a stable/carriage house, built by 1882. The 1,734 square feet (161.1 m^{2}) red-brick building matches the main house. It has been converted into a private residence, with its own address.

== See also ==
- National Register of Historic Places listings in Somerset County, New Jersey
- List of Gilded Age mansions
