= Somerville, New Jersey =

Borough in Somerset County, New Jersey, US

- Borough
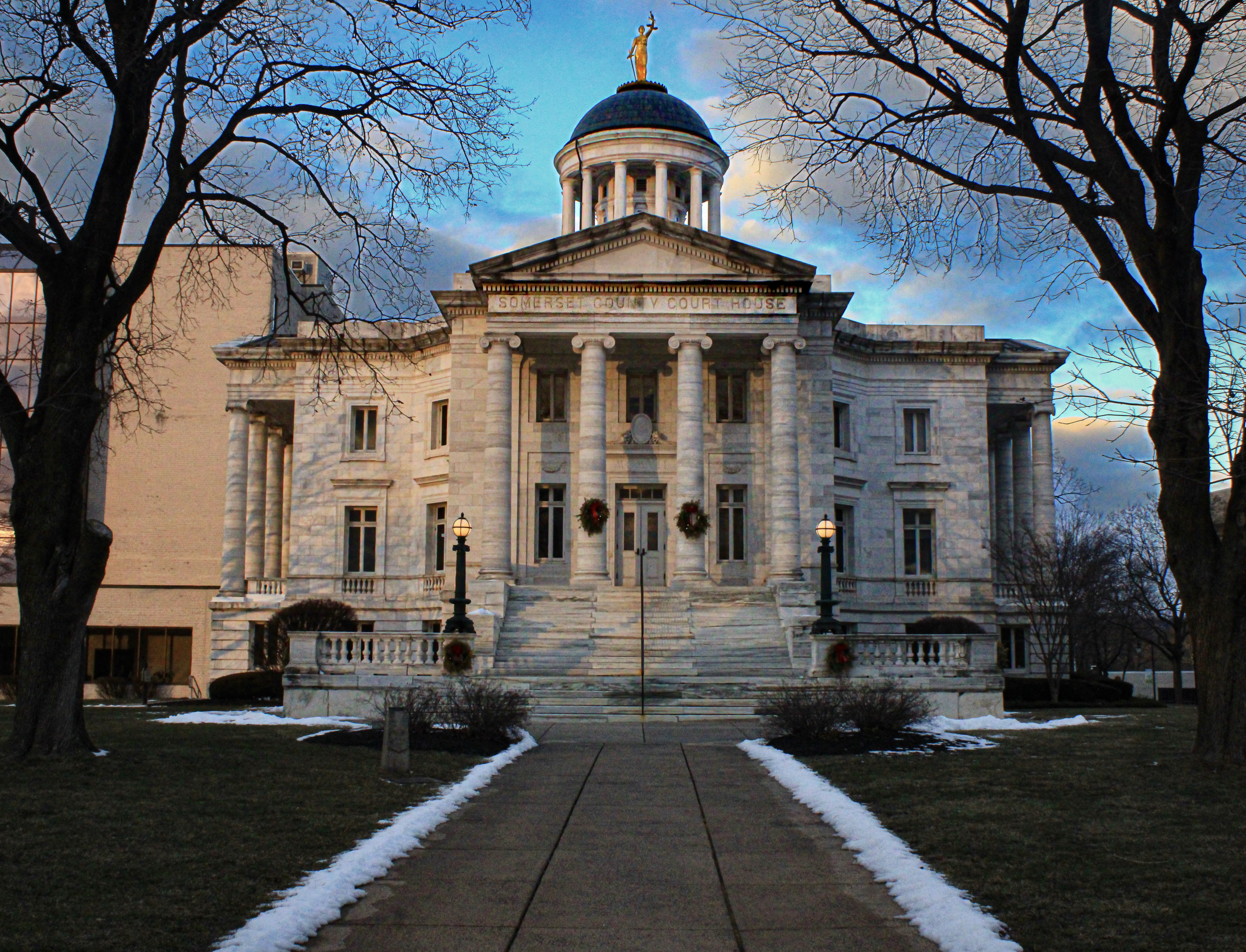
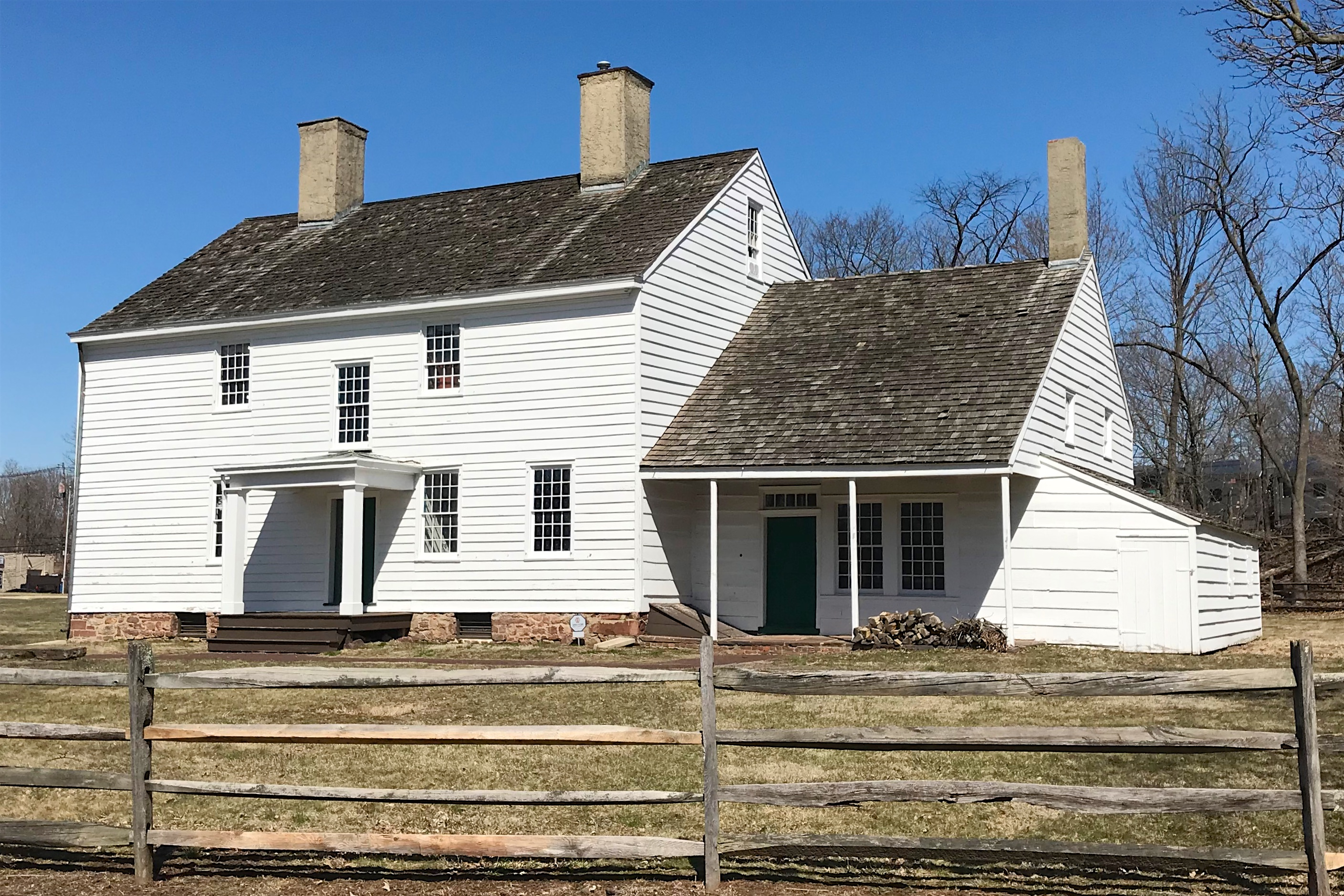
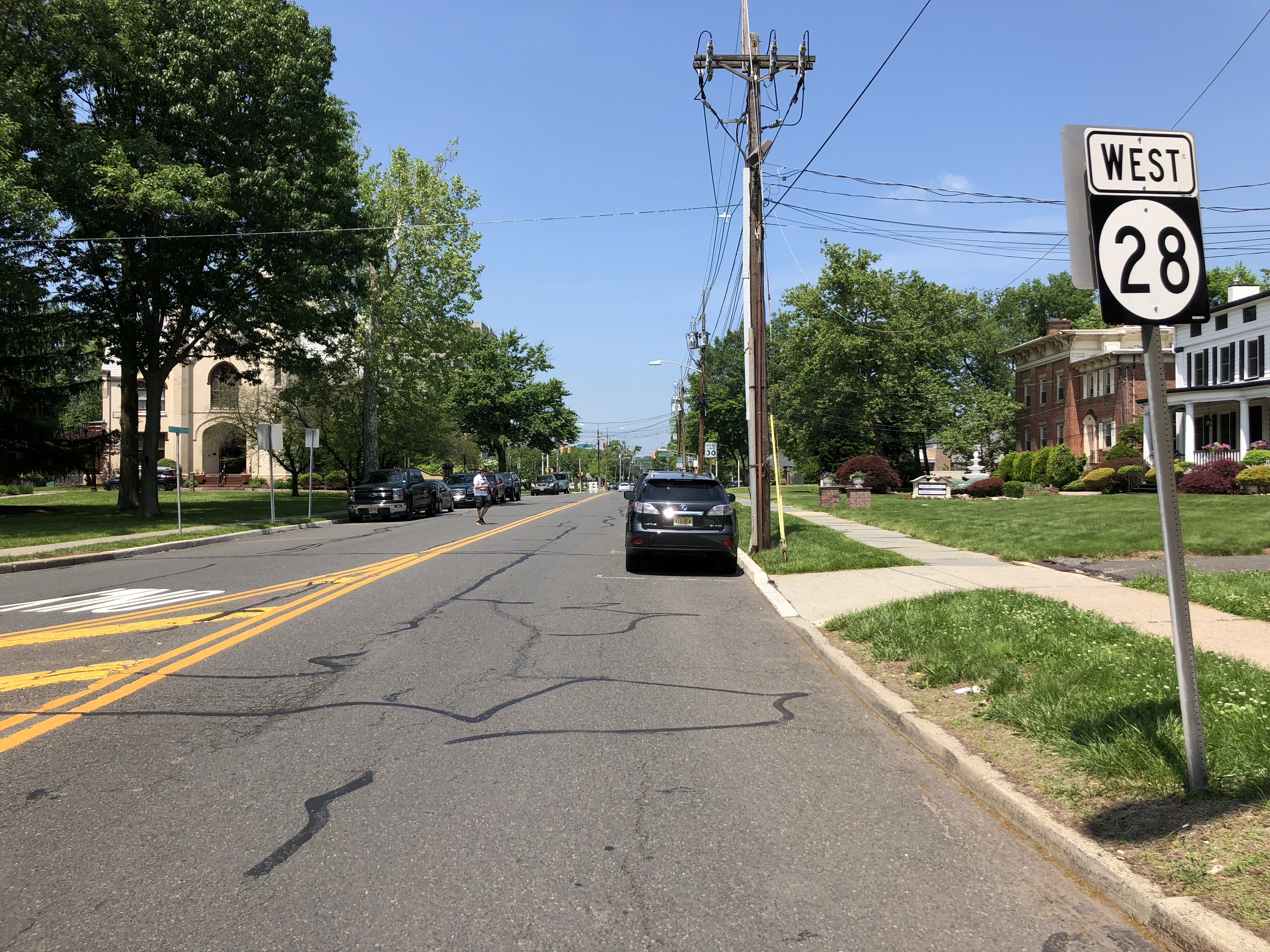
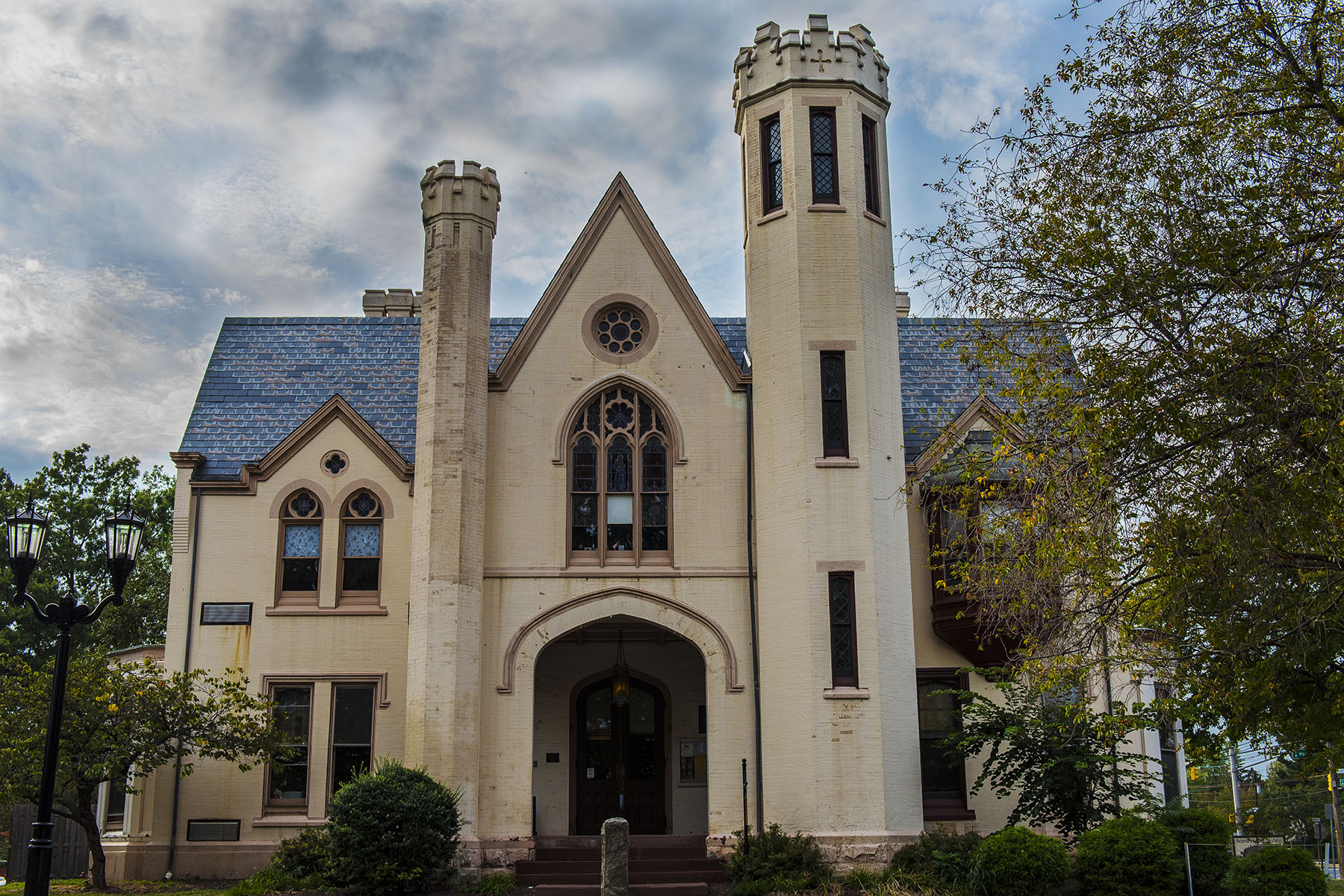
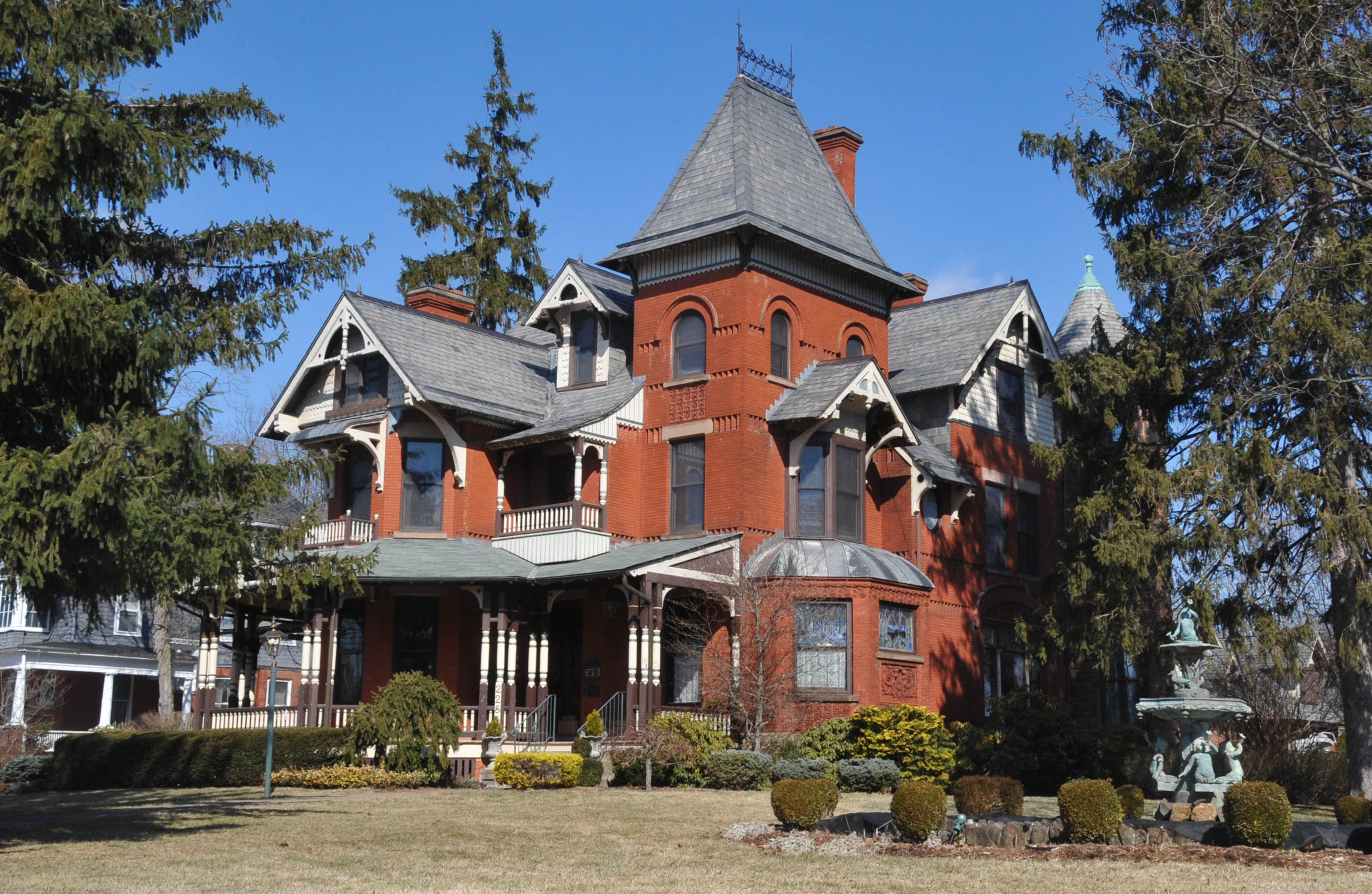
- Somerset County Courthouse Wallace House West End Avenue Daniel Robert House – Borough Hall and Public Library J. Harper Smith Mansion

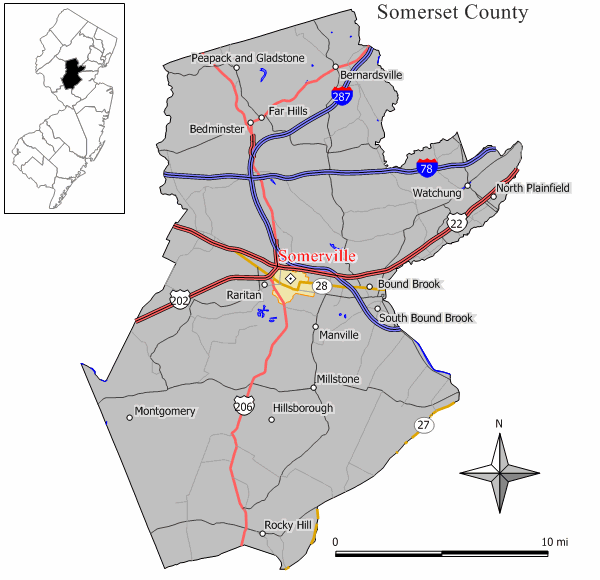
- Location of Somerville in Somerset County highlighted in yellow (right). Inset map: Location of Somerset County in New Jersey highlighted in black (left).

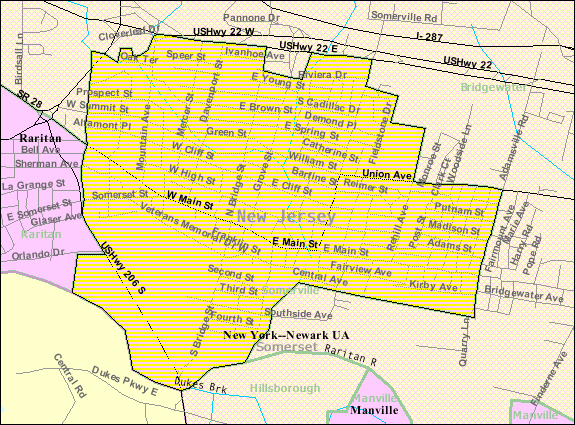
- Census Bureau map of Somerville, New Jersey
- Interactive map of Somerville, New Jersey
- Location in Somerset County Location in New Jersey Location in the United States
- Coordinates: 40.569749°N 74.607682°W
- Country: United States
- State: New Jersey
- County: Somerset
- Incorporated: March 25, 1863 (as town)
- Reincorporated: April 16, 1909 (as borough)
- Named for: Somerset, England

Government
  - Type: Borough
  - Body: Borough Council
  - Mayor: Brian Gallagher (R, term ends December 31, 2027)
  - Administrator / Municipal clerk: Kevin Sluka

Area
  - Total: 2.37 sq mi (6.13 km^{2})
  - Land: 2.34 sq mi (6.05 km^{2})
  - Water: 0.027 sq mi (0.07 km^{2}) 1.18%
  - Rank: 384th of 565 in state 16th of 21 in county
- Elevation: 62 ft (19 m)

Population (2020)
  - Total: 12,346
  - Estimate (2024): 14,428
  - Rank: 207th of 565 in state 9th of 21 in county
  - Density: 5,280.6/sq mi (2,038.9/km^{2})
  - Rank: 106th of 565 in state 4th of 21 in county
- Time zone: UTC−05:00 (Eastern (EST))
  - Summer (DST): UTC−04:00 (Eastern (EDT))
- ZIP Codes: 08876
- Area code: 908
- FIPS code: 3403568460
- GNIS feature ID: 0885398
- Website: www.somervillenj.org

Somerville is a borough in and the county seat of Somerset County, in the U.S. state of New Jersey. The borough is located in the heart of the Raritan Valley region within the New York Metropolitan Area, located about 33 miles (53 km) from Manhattan and 20 miles (32 km) from Staten Island. The borough has grown to become a commercial hub for Central Jersey and commuter town of New York City.

As of the 2020 United States census, the borough's population was 12,346, an increase of 248 (+2.0%) from the 2010 census count of 12,098, which in turn reflected a decline of 325 (-2.6%) from the 12,423 counted in the 2000 census.

Somerville was originally formed as a town on March 25, 1863, within a portion of Bridgewater Township. Somerville was incorporated as a borough by an act of the New Jersey Legislature on April 16, 1909, based on the results of a referendum held on May 4, 1909, at which point it was fully set off from Bridgewater Township. It is home of the oldest competitive bicycle race in the United States.

The borough is named for Somerset in England.

== History ==
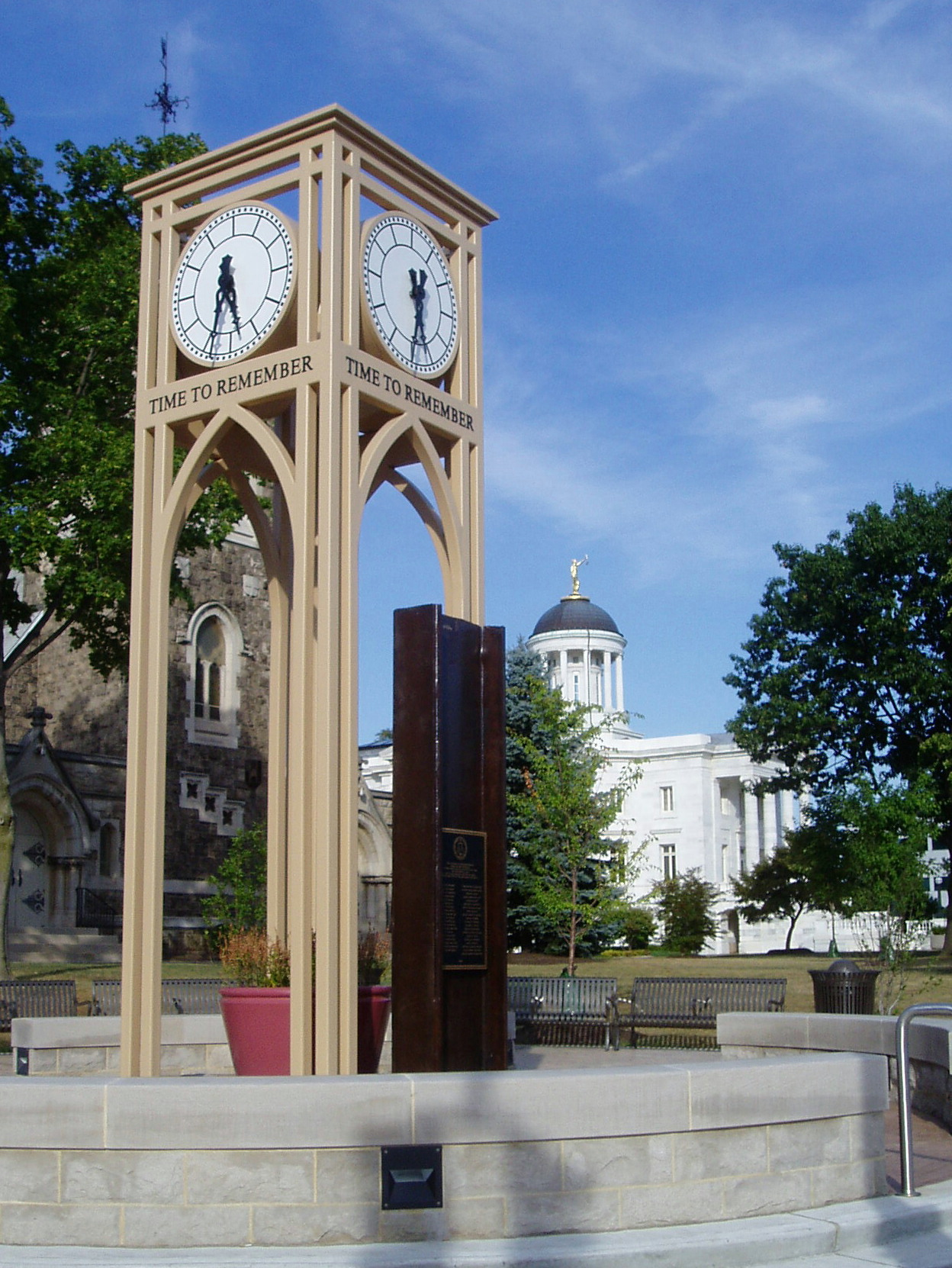
September 11, 2001, terrorist attacks Memorial and Court House, Somerville

=== Early development ===
Somerville was settled in colonial times primarily by the Dutch who purchased land from the English proprietors of the colony. The Dutch established their church near what is today Somerville and a Dutch Reformed minister or Domine lived at the Old Dutch Parsonage from about 1754. The early village grew up around a church, courthouse and a tavern built at a crossroads shortly after the American Revolution. The name "Somerville" was taken from four brothers of the Somerville family, Edward, John and James from Drishane and Castlehaven, County Cork, Ireland, who first founded the town in the 1750s. Somerville was originally a sparsely populated farming community, but rapidly grew after the completion of the railroad in the 1840s and development of water power along the Raritan River in the 1850s. Early industry included brick making from the plentiful red clay and shale on which Somerville is built. While much of the borough features distinctive Victorian architecture in several neighborhoods and along its Main Street, other periods are represented. National Register sites in Somerville include the white marble 1909 Somerville Court House and the wooden and stone colonial Wallace House (today a museum) where George Washington spent a winter during the American Revolutionary War. Near the Wallace House is the Old Dutch Parsonage, where Reverend Jacob Rutsen Hardenbergh, a founder and first president of Rutgers University, then called Queens College, lived. Register listed Victorian structures include the James Harper Smith Estate (privately owned), St. John's Episcopal Church and rectory, and the Fire Museum (a vintage fire house). Other notable, register eligible structures are the Victorian train station (privately owned) and the municipal building, the former Robert Mansion.

Originally the center of local commerce, the borough has evolved into a destination for boutique retail and dining. Modern highways today surround and traverse Somerville, including U.S. Route 22, U.S. Route 202, U.S. Route 206 and Route 28 and is within 5 miles (8.0 km) of Interstate 287 and Interstate 78, making it an important hub in central New Jersey.

=== Tour of Somerville ===
In 1940, the first competitive bicycle race, called the Tour of Somerville was established by bicycle shop owner, Fred Kugler, to showcase his son, Furman, who was a national cycling champion, and who won the initial men's competition. His daughter, Mildred won the women's. The 50-mile (80 km) race is held annually and has since become the oldest competitive bicycle race in the U.S. It carries a purse of $10,000 for each winner of the women's and men's races.

=== Downtown today ===
Somerville remains Somerset County's downtown and is the heart of its designated regional center, drawing visitors for shopping and dining. Main Street Somerville maintains most of its historical buildings, although many have been converted for retail uses. Restaurants in Somerville draw people from the surrounding area. Several of the factories in Somerville were abandoned and replaced with modern office buildings or remodeled as apartments. Somerville has had an important African American community, a distinguished member of which was Paul Robeson. Character actor Lee Van Cleef was also a resident. One of the founders of modern American Dance, Ruth St. Denis, made her professional debut at Somerset Hall, once a vaudeville theatre and today a local restaurant.

=== Future redevelopment ===
The shopping center on the west side of the downtown area was demolished and a new shopping center, town homes and other amenities will be built on the shopping center land and on adjacent land in the former borough landfill to the south. Ground was broken for a new "world class" ShopRite supermarket in March 2011 and opened in November 2011. Borough planners envision a transit village style redevelopment centered around the Somerville train station.

=== Hurricane Floyd ===
Somerville was hit hard by Hurricane Floyd in September 1999, despite its having been downgraded to a tropical storm by the time it impacted the vicinity. The borough received a record 13.34 inches (339 mm) of rain over three days during the slow moving storm, causing significant flooding and considerable damage.

=== Regulation concerns ===
Numerous local and national media publications reported on how the state of New Jersey had eased regulations allowing for home baked goods to be made and sold from a home, but how Somerville in particular still suffers from, "...[a] draconian ordinance that creates a contradiction between Somerville's zoning policies and New Jersey's home baking law..." making it difficult for a small business owner or entrepreneur to try and earn a living in this fashion in Somerville. In order to be able to make her cookies and sell them from her home kitchen was required "... to pay a $1,000 application fee and put $4,000 into a borough escrow account", in addition to notifying neighbors, placing a public notice advertisement and having a public hearing on the application.

== Geography ==
According to the United States Census Bureau, the borough had a total area of 2.37 square miles (6.13 km^{2}), including 2.34 square miles (6.06 km^{2}) of land and 0.03 square miles (0.07 km^{2}) of water (1.18%). The borough's territory is flat land. Somerville borders the Raritan River to the south and is crossed by Peters Brook, a tributary.

The borough borders Bridgewater Township, Hillsborough Township and Raritan.

=== Climate ===
Somerville's climate is warm during summer when temperatures tend to be in the 80s and 90s and cold during winter when temperatures tend to be in the 20s and 30s.

The warmest month of the year is July with an average maximum temperature of 84.40 degrees Fahrenheit, while the coldest month of the year is January with an average minimum temperature of 19.10 °F (−7.17 °C).

Temperature variations between night and day tend to be moderate during summer with a difference that can reach 22 degrees Fahrenheit, and fairly limited during winter with an average difference of 19 degrees Fahrenheit.

The annual average precipitation at Somerville is 45.93 inches (1,167 mm). Rainfall in is fairly evenly distributed throughout the year. The wettest month of the year is July with an average rainfall of 4.81 inches (122 mm).

The climate is hot-summer humid continental (Dfa) bordering humid subtropical (Cfa). January averages below freezing, six months average above 50 °F (10 °C), and July and August average above 71.6 °F (22.0 °C). The hardiness zone was changed from 6b to 7a.

Climate data for Somerville, New Jersey
Month	Jan	Feb	Mar	Apr	May	Jun	Jul	Aug	Sep	Oct	Nov	Dec	Year
Mean daily maximum °F (°C)	39.6 (4.2)	42.1 (5.6)	49.2 (9.6)	60.4 (15.8)	71.0 (21.7)	81.2 (27.3)	86.2 (30.1)	84.3 (29.1)	74.9 (23.8)	63.9 (17.7)	52.9 (11.6)	44.5 (6.9)	61.4 (16.3)
Mean daily minimum °F (°C)	21.9 (−5.6)	23.1 (−4.9)	28.3 (−2.1)	37.3 (2.9)	47.2 (8.4)	59.3 (15.2)	64.5 (18.1)	63.0 (17.2)	52.8 (11.6)	40.7 (4.8)	32.8 (0.4)	27.4 (−2.6)	40.2 (4.6)

== Demographics ==
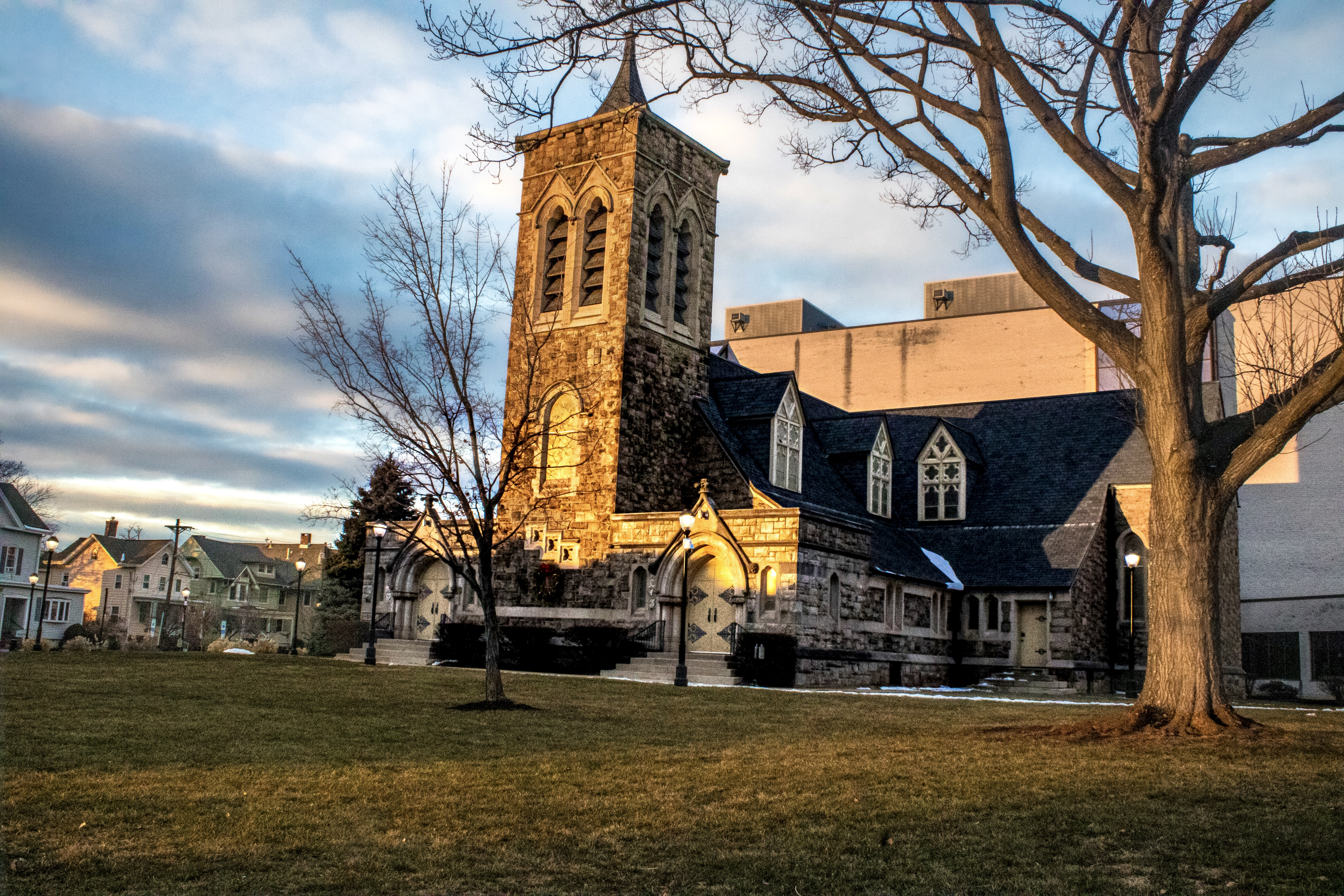
First Reformed Church of Raritan on Main Street

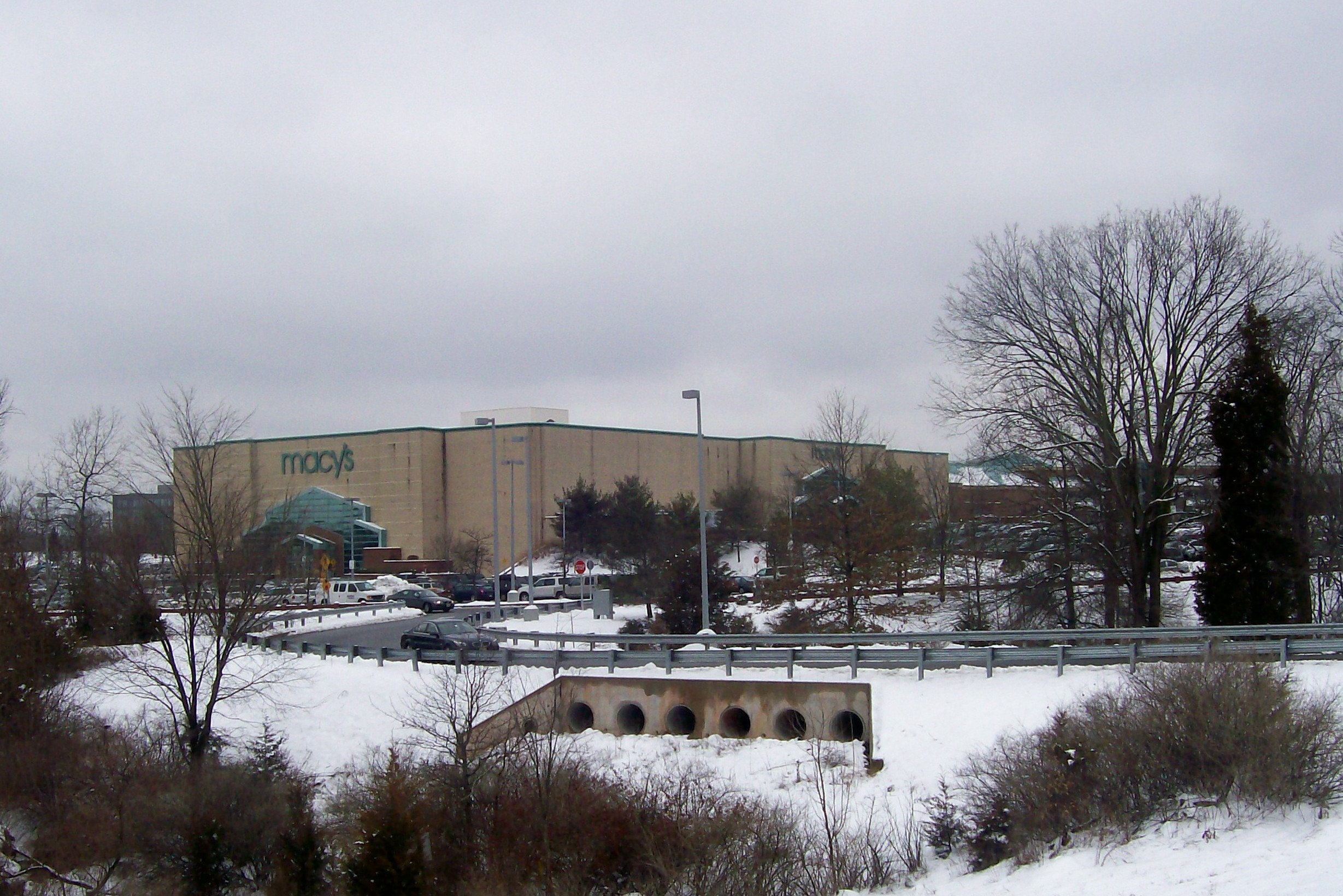
Super-regional shopping mall Bridgewater Commons is located in bordering Bridgewater. It is a major shopping destination for Somerville residents.

Historical population
Census	Pop.	Note	%±
1870	2,236		—
1880	3,105		38.9%
1890	3,861		24.3%
1900	4,843		25.4%
1910	5,060		4.5%
1920	6,718		32.8%
1930	8,255		22.9%
1940	8,720		5.6%
1950	11,571		32.7%
1960	12,458		7.7%
1970	13,652		9.6%
1980	11,973		−12.3%
1990	11,632		−2.8%
2000	12,423		6.8%
2010	12,098		−2.6%
2020	12,346		2.0%
2024 (est.)	14,428	▲	16.9%
Population sources: 1870–1920 1870 1880–1890; 1890–1910 1910–1930; 1940–2000 2000; 2010 2020

=== 2020 census ===
As of the 2020 census, Somerville had a population of 12,346. The median age was 36.1 years. 19.1% of residents were under the age of 18 and 12.5% of residents were 65 years of age or older. For every 100 females there were 102.9 males, and for every 100 females age 18 and over there were 102.1 males age 18 and over.

100.0% of residents lived in urban areas, while 0.0% lived in rural areas.

There were 5,050 households in Somerville, of which 27.5% had children under the age of 18 living in them. Of all households, 40.1% were married-couple households, 23.5% were households with a male householder and no spouse or partner present, and 27.4% were households with a female householder and no spouse or partner present. About 33.1% of all households were made up of individuals and 10.1% had someone living alone who was 65 years of age or older.

There were 5,387 housing units, of which 6.3% were vacant. The homeowner vacancy rate was 1.2% and the rental vacancy rate was 6.8%.

Racial composition as of the 2020 census
Race	Number	Percent
White	6,557	53.1%
Black or African American	1,267	10.3%
American Indian and Alaska Native	92	0.7%
Asian	1,462	11.8%
Native Hawaiian and Other Pacific Islander	2	0.0%
Some other race	1,489	12.1%
Two or more races	1,477	12.0%
Hispanic or Latino (of any race)	3,113	25.2%

=== 2010 census ===
The 2010 United States census counted 12,098 people, 4,591 households, and 2,778 families in the borough. The population density was 5,189.5 per square mile (2,003.7/km^{2}). There were 4,951 housing units at an average density of 2,123.8 per square mile (820.0/km^{2}). The racial makeup was 65.64% (7,941) White, 12.15% (1,470) Black or African American, 0.34% (41) Native American, 11.37% (1,375) Asian, 0.07% (9) Pacific Islander, 6.34% (767) from other races, and 4.09% (495) from two or more races. Hispanic or Latino of any race were 23.75% (2,873) of the population.

Of the 4,591 households, 28.7% had children under the age of 18; 43.7% were married couples living together; 11.4% had a female householder with no husband present and 39.5% were non-families. Of all households, 30.8% were made up of individuals and 10.2% had someone living alone who was 65 years of age or older. The average household size was 2.54 and the average family size was 3.20.

21.3% of the population were under the age of 18, 8.9% from 18 to 24, 34.0% from 25 to 44, 24.8% from 45 to 64, and 11.0% who were 65 years of age or older. The median age was 35.5 years. For every 100 females, the population had 107.3 males. For every 100 females ages 18 and older there were 106.7 males.

The Census Bureau's 2006–2010 American Community Survey showed that (in 2010 inflation-adjusted dollars) median household income was $69,836 (with a margin of error of +/− $5,384) and the median family income was $80,461 (+/− $9,281). Males had a median income of $45,929 (+/− $5,005) versus $46,540 (+/− $3,751) for females. The per capita income for the borough was $30,272 (+/− $2,145). About 3.6% of families and 6.9% of the population were below the poverty line, including 3.8% of those under age 18 and 10.8% of those age 65 or over.

=== 2000 census ===
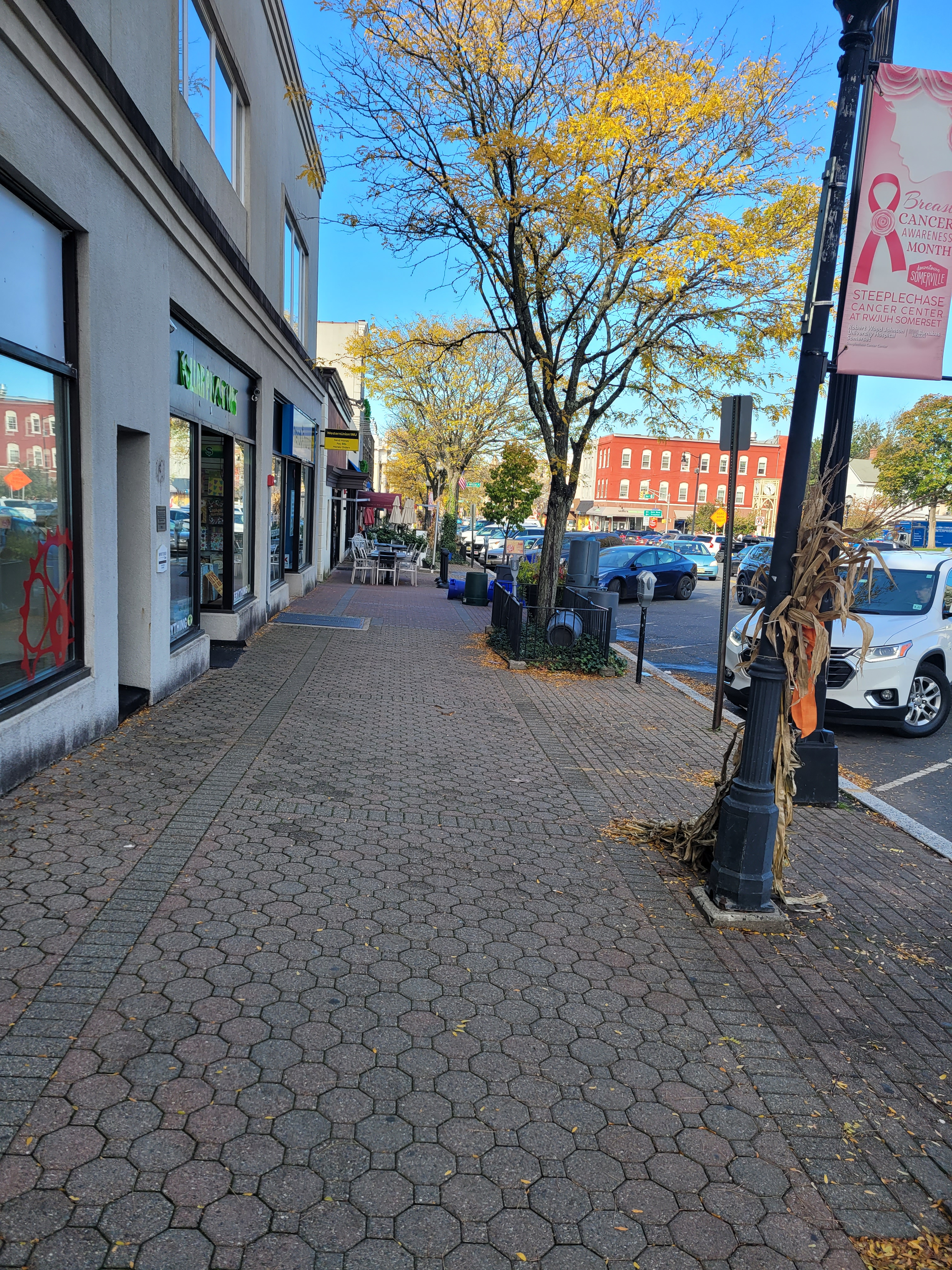
Downtown Somerville

As of the 2000 United States census there were 12,423 people, 4,743 households, and 2,893 families residing in the borough. The population density was 5,262.4 inhabitants per square mile (2,031.8/km^{2}). There were 4,882 housing units at an average density of 2,068.0 per square mile (798.5/km^{2}). The racial makeup of the borough was 71.21% White, 12.93% African American, 0.19% Native American, 7.35% Asian, 0.02% Pacific Islander, 5.10% from other races, and 3.20% from two or more races. Hispanic or Latino of any race were 17.00% of the population.

There were 4,743 households, of which 28.6% had children under the age of 18, 44.5% were married couples living together, 11.9% had a female householder with no husband present, and 39.0% were non-families. 31.4% of all households were made up of individuals, and 11.2% had someone living alone who was 65 years of age or older. The average household size was 2.49 and the average family size was 3.15.

The borough population consists of 21.9% under the age of 18, 9.0% from 18 to 24, 35.8% from 25 to 44, 19.3% from 45 to 64, and 14.0% who were 65 years of age or older. The median age was 36 years. For every 100 females, there were 101.2 males. For every 100 females age 18 and over, there were 99.1 males.

The median income for a household in the borough was $51,237, and the median income for a family was $60,422. Males had a median income of $40,585 versus $32,697 for females. The per capita income for the borough was $23,310. About 4.8% of families and 7.7% of the population were below the poverty line, including 10.7% of those under age 18 and 8.6% of those age 65 or over.

== Government ==
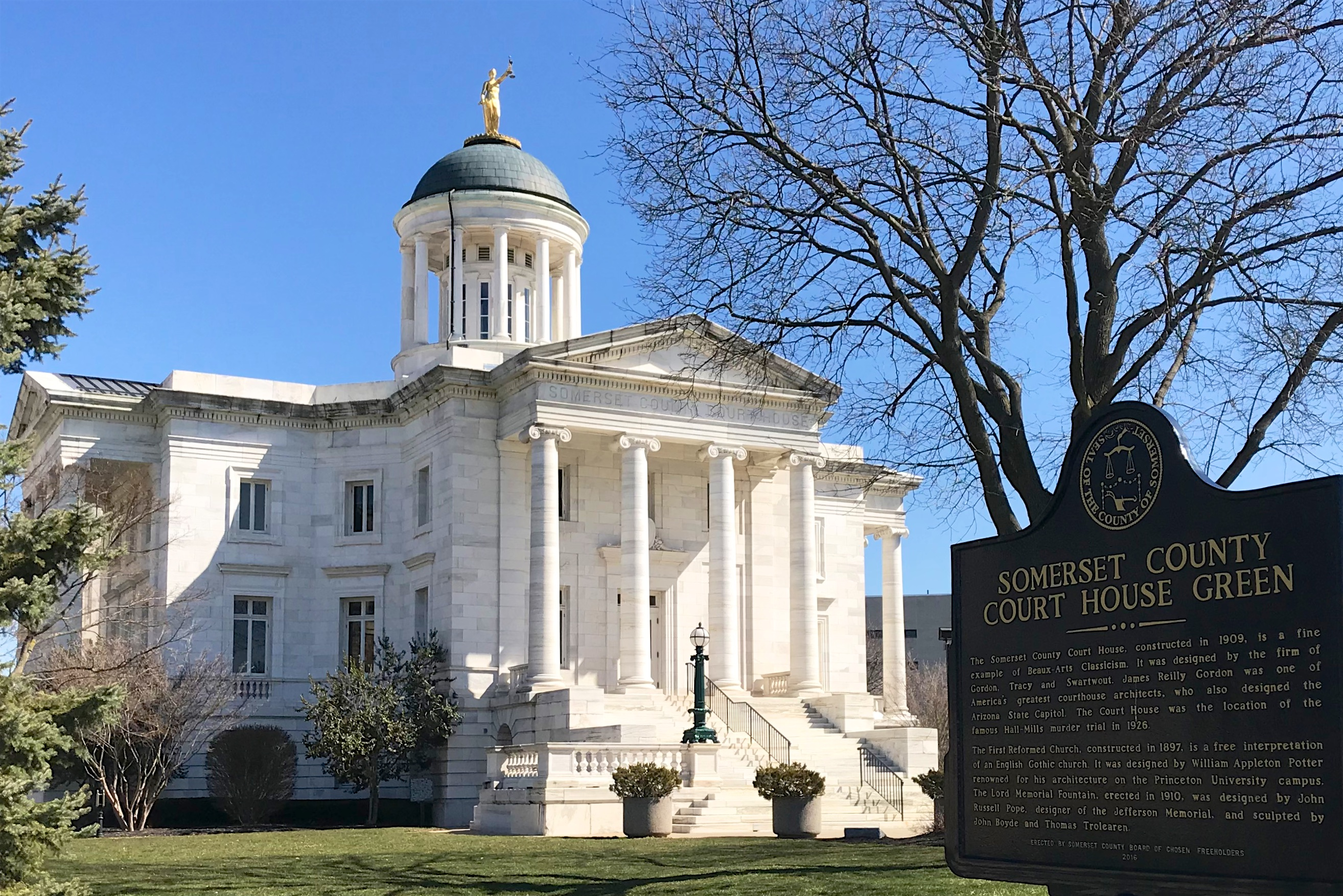
Somerset County Courthouse

=== Local government ===
Somerville is governed under the borough form of New Jersey municipal government, which is used in 218 municipalities (of the 564) statewide, making it the most common form of government in New Jersey. The governing body is comprised of the mayor and the borough council, with all positions elected at-large on a partisan basis as part of the November general election. The mayor is elected directly by the voters to a four-year term of office. The borough council includes six members elected to serve three-year terms on a staggered basis, with two seats coming up for election each year in a three-year cycle. The borough form of government used by Somerville is a "weak mayor / strong council" government in which council members act as the legislative body with the mayor presiding at meetings and voting only in the event of a tie. The mayor can veto ordinances subject to an override by a two-thirds majority vote of the council. The mayor makes committee and liaison assignments for council members, and most appointments are made by the mayor with the advice and consent of the council. The borough council elects a member to serve as Council President to act in the absence of the mayor. Each council member is appointed by the mayor to one of six standing committee's during the Annual Reorganization Meeting held on January 1 of each year.

As of 2024, the mayor of Somerville is Republican Brian Gallagher, whose term of office ends December 31, 2027. Members of the Somerville Borough Council are Council President Roger Vroom III (D, 2025), Theresa Bonner (D, 2026), Glen Denys (D, 2026), Thompson H. Mitchell (D, 2024), RanD Pitts (D, 2024) and Gina Stravic (D, 2025).

In January 2022, the borough council appointed Gina Stravic to fill the seat expiring in December 2022 that had been held by Jane C. Kobuta until she resigned from office.

=== Federal, state, and county representation ===
Somerville is located in the 7th Congressional District and is part of New Jersey's 23rd state legislative district.

For the 119th United States Congress, New Jersey's 7th congressional district is represented by Thomas Kean Jr. (R, Westfield). New Jersey is represented in the United States Senate by Democrats Cory Booker (Newark, term ends 2027) and Andy Kim (Moorestown, term ends 2031).

For the 2026–2027 session, the 23rd legislative district of the New Jersey Legislature is represented in the State Senate by Doug Steinhardt (R, Lopatcong Township) and in the General Assembly by John DiMaio (R, Hackettstown) and Erik Peterson (R, Franklin Township).

Somerset County is governed by a five-member Board of County Commissioners, whose members are elected at-large to three-year terms of office on a staggered basis, with one or two seats coming up for election each year. At an annual reorganization meeting held in the first week of January, the board selects a Director and deputy director from among its members. As of 2025, Somerset County's County Commissioners are Director Shanel Robinson (D, Franklin Township, term as commissioner ends 2027; term as director ends 2026), Deputy Director Paul Drake (D, Hillsborough Township, term as commissioner and as deputy director ends 2026), Melonie Marano (D, Green Brook Township, 2028), Elizabeth Graner (D, Bernards Township, 2026; elected to serve an unexpired term) and Sara Sooy (D, Bedminster Township, 2027).

Constitutional officers, elected on a countywide basis are Clerk Steve Peter (D, Somerville, 2027), Sheriff Darrin Russo (D, Franklin Township, 2028) and Surrogate Bernice "Tina" Jalloh (D, Franklin Township, 2030).

=== Politics ===
As of March 2011, there were a total of 6,565 registered voters in Somerville, of which 1,848 (28.1% vs. 26.0% countywide) were registered as Democrats, 1,358 (20.7% vs. 25.7%) were registered as Republicans and 3,349 (51.0% vs. 48.2%) were registered as Unaffiliated. There were 10 voters registered as Libertarians or Greens. Among the borough's 2010 Census population, 54.3% (vs. 60.4% in Somerset County) were registered to vote, including 69.0% of those ages 18 and over (vs. 80.4% countywide).

United States presidential election results for Somerville
Year	Republican		Democratic		Third party(ies)	
Year	No.	%	No.	%	No.	%
2024	2,187	35.37%	3,842	62.13%	155	2.51%
2020	1,865	32.73%	3,739	65.61%	95	1.67%
2016	1,678	34.85%	2,908	60.39%	229	4.76%
2012	1,631	36.37%	2,779	61.96%	75	1.67%
2008	1,814	38.49%	2,847	60.41%	52	1.10%
2004	2,019	44.26%	2,485	54.47%	58	1.27%
2000	1,623	39.75%	2,163	52.98%	297	7.27%

In the 2012 presidential election, Democrat Barack Obama received 62.0% of the vote (2,779 cast), ahead of Republican Mitt Romney with 36.4% (1,631 votes), and other candidates with 1.7% (75 votes), among the 4,516 ballots cast by the borough's 6,952 registered voters (31 ballots were spoiled), for a turnout of 65.0%. In the 2008 presidential election, Democrat Barack Obama received 2,847 votes (59.9% vs. 52.1% countywide), ahead of Republican John McCain with 1,814 votes (38.2% vs. 46.1%) and other candidates with 52 votes (1.1% vs. 1.1%), among the 4,751 ballots cast by the borough's 6,547 registered voters, for a turnout of 72.6% (vs. 78.7% in Somerset County). In the 2004 presidential election, Democrat John Kerry received 2,485 votes (53.6% vs. 47.2% countywide), ahead of Republican George W. Bush with 2,019 votes (43.6% vs. 51.5%) and other candidates with 58 votes (1.3% vs. 0.9%), among the 4,633 ballots cast by the borough's 5,974 registered voters, for a turnout of 77.6% (vs. 81.7% in the whole county).

Gubernatorial election results for Somerville
Year	Republican		Democratic		Third party(ies)	
Year	No.	%	No.	%	No.	%
2025	1,635	31.95%	3,446	67.34%	36	0.70%
2021	1,511	41.16%	2,109	57.45%	51	1.39%
2017	1,264	40.99%	1,725	55.93%	95	3.08%
2013	1,707	58.98%	1,123	38.80%	64	2.21%
2009	1,465	47.30%	1,265	40.85%	367	11.85%
2005	1,328	43.14%	1,567	50.91%	183	5.95%

In the 2013 gubernatorial election, Republican Chris Christie received 59.0% of the vote (1,707 cast), ahead of Democrat Barbara Buono with 38.8% (1,123 votes), and other candidates with 2.2% (64 votes), among the 2,972 ballots cast by the borough's 7,019 registered voters (78 ballots were spoiled), for a turnout of 42.3%. In the 2009 gubernatorial election, Republican Chris Christie received 1,465 votes (46.8% vs. 55.8% countywide), ahead of Democrat Jon Corzine with 1,265 votes (40.4% vs. 34.1%), Independent Chris Daggett with 334 votes (10.7% vs. 8.7%) and other candidates with 33 votes (1.1% vs. 0.7%), among the 3,128 ballots cast by the borough's 6,605 registered voters, yielding a 47.4% turnout (vs. 52.5% in the county).

United States Senate election results for Somerville1
Year	Republican		Democratic		Third party(ies)	
Year	No.	%	No.	%	No.	%
2024	2,103	35.30%	3,689	61.92%	166	2.79%
2018	1,628	38.66%	2,426	57.61%	157	3.73%
2012	1,612	37.65%	2,593	60.56%	77	1.80%
2006	1,286	43.48%	1,557	52.64%	115	3.89%

United States Senate election results for Somerville2
Year	Republican		Democratic		Third party(ies)	
Year	No.	%	No.	%	No.	%
2020	1,899	33.60%	3,645	64.50%	107	1.89%
2014	1,007	38.44%	1,562	59.62%	51	1.95%
2013	745	38.96%	1,149	60.09%	18	0.94%
2008	1,864	42.37%	2,411	54.81%	124	2.82%

== Education ==
The Somerville Public Schools serve students in pre-kindergarten through twelfth grade. As of the 2021–22 school year, the district, comprised of three schools, had an enrollment of 2,198 students and 212.5 classroom teachers (on an FTE basis), for a student–teacher ratio of 10.3:1. Schools in the district (with 2021–22 enrollment data from the National Center for Education Statistics) are Van Derveer Elementary School with 712 students in grades PreK-5, Somerville Middle School with 314 students in grades 6-8 and Somerville High School with 1,142 students in grades 9-12. Students from Branchburg Township attend the district's high school as part of a sending/receiving relationship with the Branchburg Township School District. For many years, Branchburg has accounted for 60–65% of the high school's enrollment.

Immaculata High School is a private, coeducational, Roman Catholic high school, founded in 1962. The school enrolls approximately 850 students in grades 9 to 12. Immaculate Conception School is a Catholic private coeducational day school, founded in 1957, for students in grades Pre-K through 8. Both schools operate under the auspices of the Roman Catholic Diocese of Metuchen.

== Infrastructure ==
=== Transportation ===
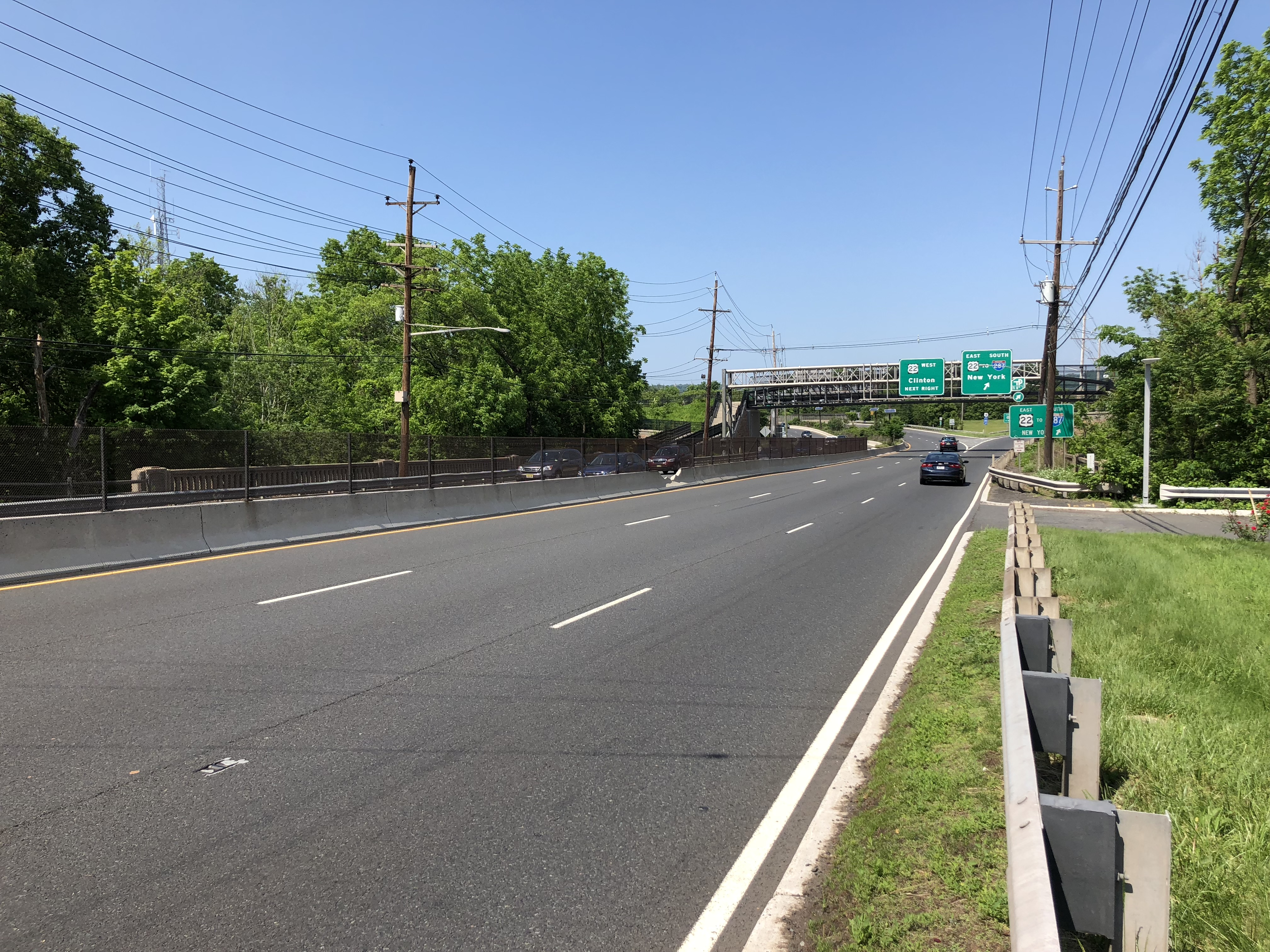
U.S. Route 202 / U.S. Route 206 in Somerville, the largest and busiest highway in the borough

==== Roads and highways ====
As of May 2010, the borough had a total of 36.16 miles (58.19 km) of roadways, of which 30.96 miles (49.83 km) were maintained by the municipality, 1.90 miles (3.06 km) by Somerset County and 3.30 miles (5.31 km) by the New Jersey Department of Transportation.

U.S. Route 22 runs along the northern boundary of Somerville and offers connections to the state highway network. U.S. Route 202 and U.S. Route 206 runs along the western boundary of Somerville, via the Somerville Circle, and provides north–south connections to nearby municipalities. Route 28 also run along the entire borough. Interstate 287 is in neighboring Bridgewater Township and is accessible via U.S. routes 22 and 202/206.

==== Public transportation ====
The Somerville train station offers service on NJ Transit's Raritan Valley Line, with frequent service to Newark Penn Station, with connecting service to New York Penn Station in Midtown Manhattan.

The closest airport with scheduled service is Newark Liberty International Airport, located 26 miles (42 km) north (about 35 minutes drive) from Somerville.

=== Healthcare ===
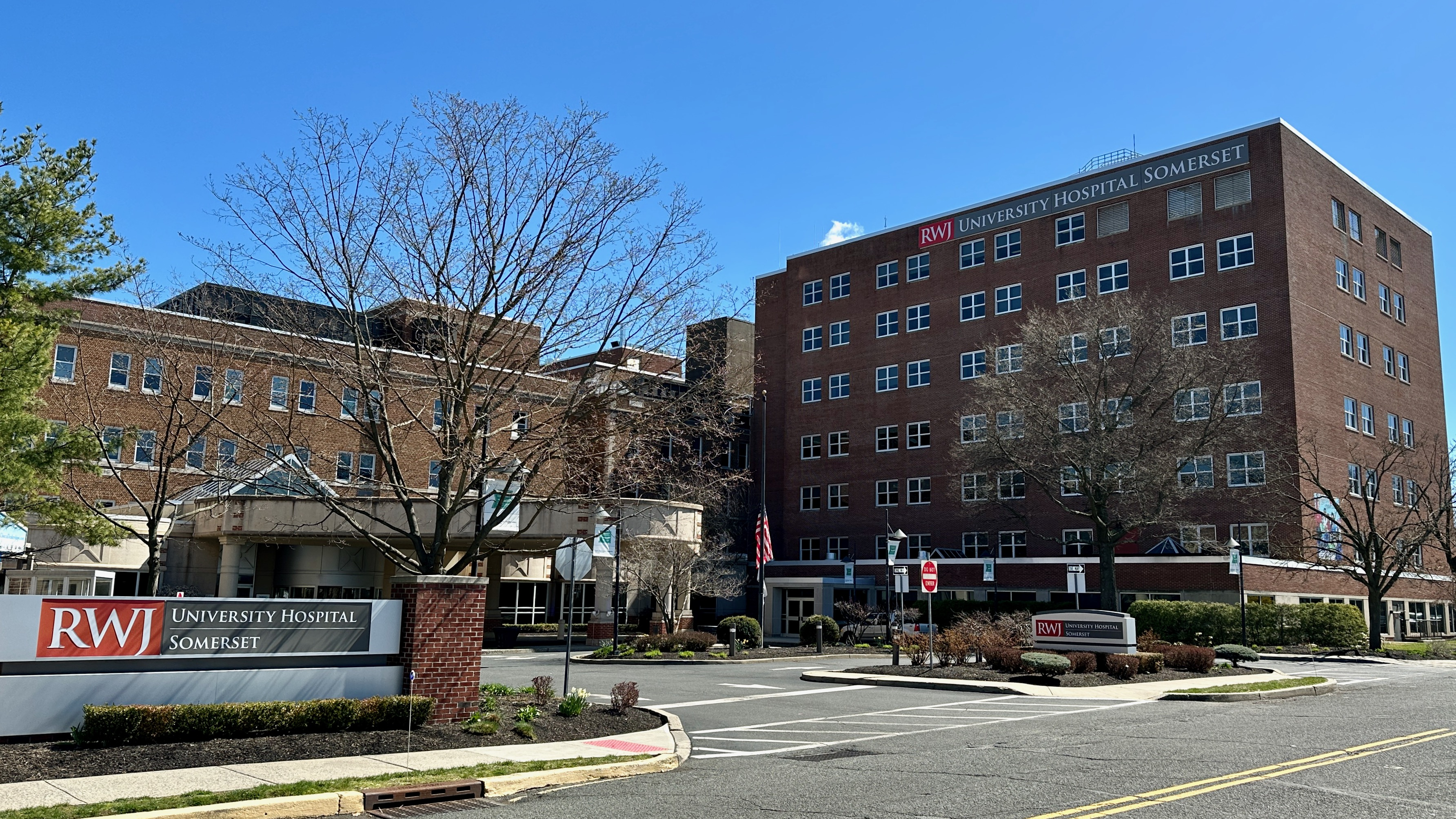
Robert Wood Johnson University Hospital Somerset

Robert Wood Johnson University Hospital Somerset is located in the borough, and provides healthcare for Greater Somerset. The hospital was originally founded as Somerset Hospital in 1901, and since has grown into a major university medical center. Since June 1, 2014, the 355 bed facility has been affiliated with Rutgers Robert Wood Johnson Medical School, the largest healthcare network in the state.

== Points of interest ==
The following locations in Somerville are listed on the National Register of Historic Places:

- Wallace House, New Jersey State Historic House Museum – Washington's Headquarters during the second Middlebrook encampment (1778–79).
- Old Dutch Parsonage, New Jersey State Historic Site – First parsonage of the Dutch Reformed Church in Somerset County and home of Reverend Jacob Rutsen Hardenbergh, a founder and later first president of Queens College (now Rutgers University).
- Daniel Robert House, Somerville Borough Hall – Based on Alexander Jackson Davis design, classic example of American Gothic architecture.
- J. Harper Smith Mansion – Library designed by Horace Trumbauer.
- St. John's Episcopal Church – Built in 1895 and designed by Horace Trumbauer.
- West End Hose Company Number 3 – the Somerville Fire Department Museum.
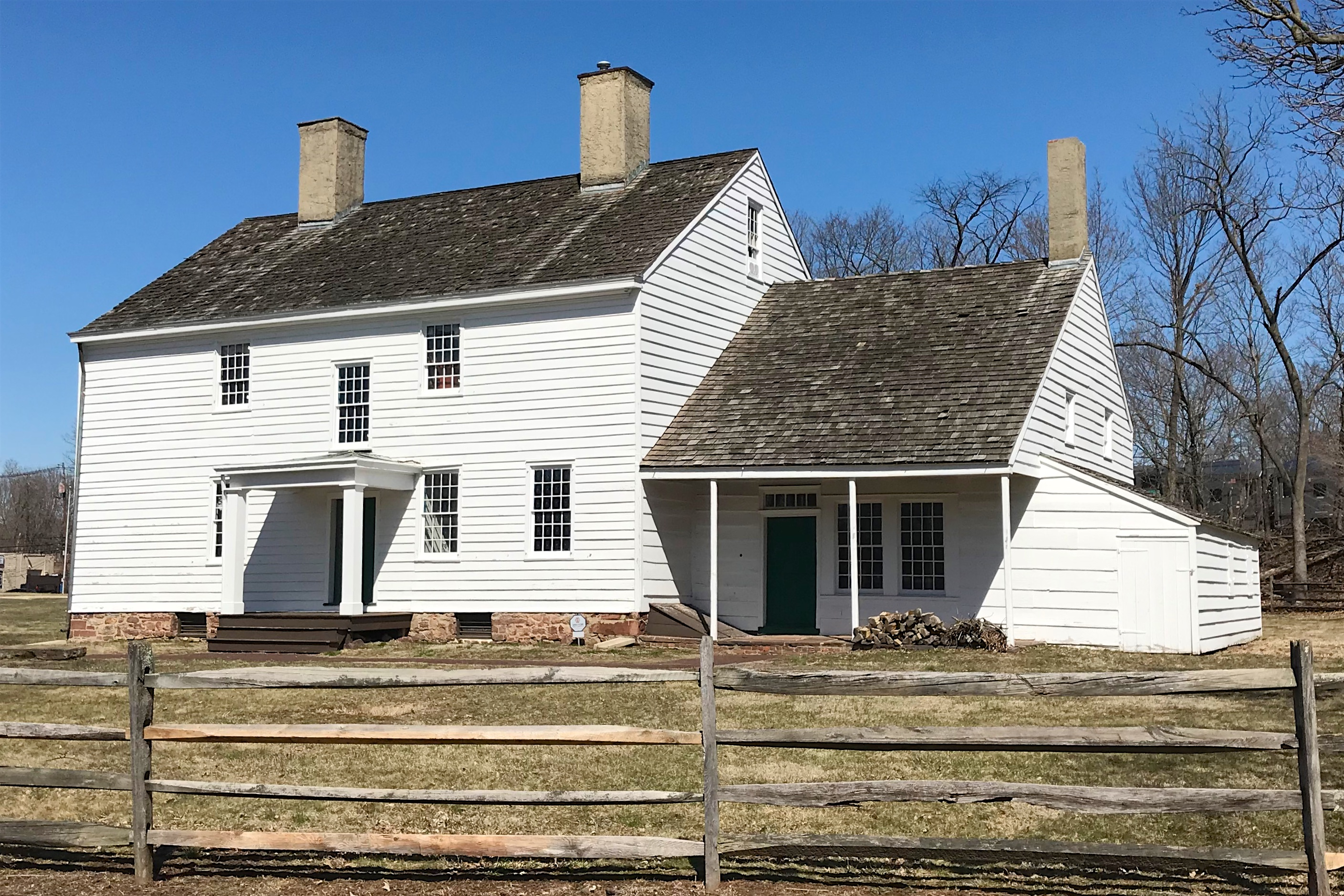
Wallace House

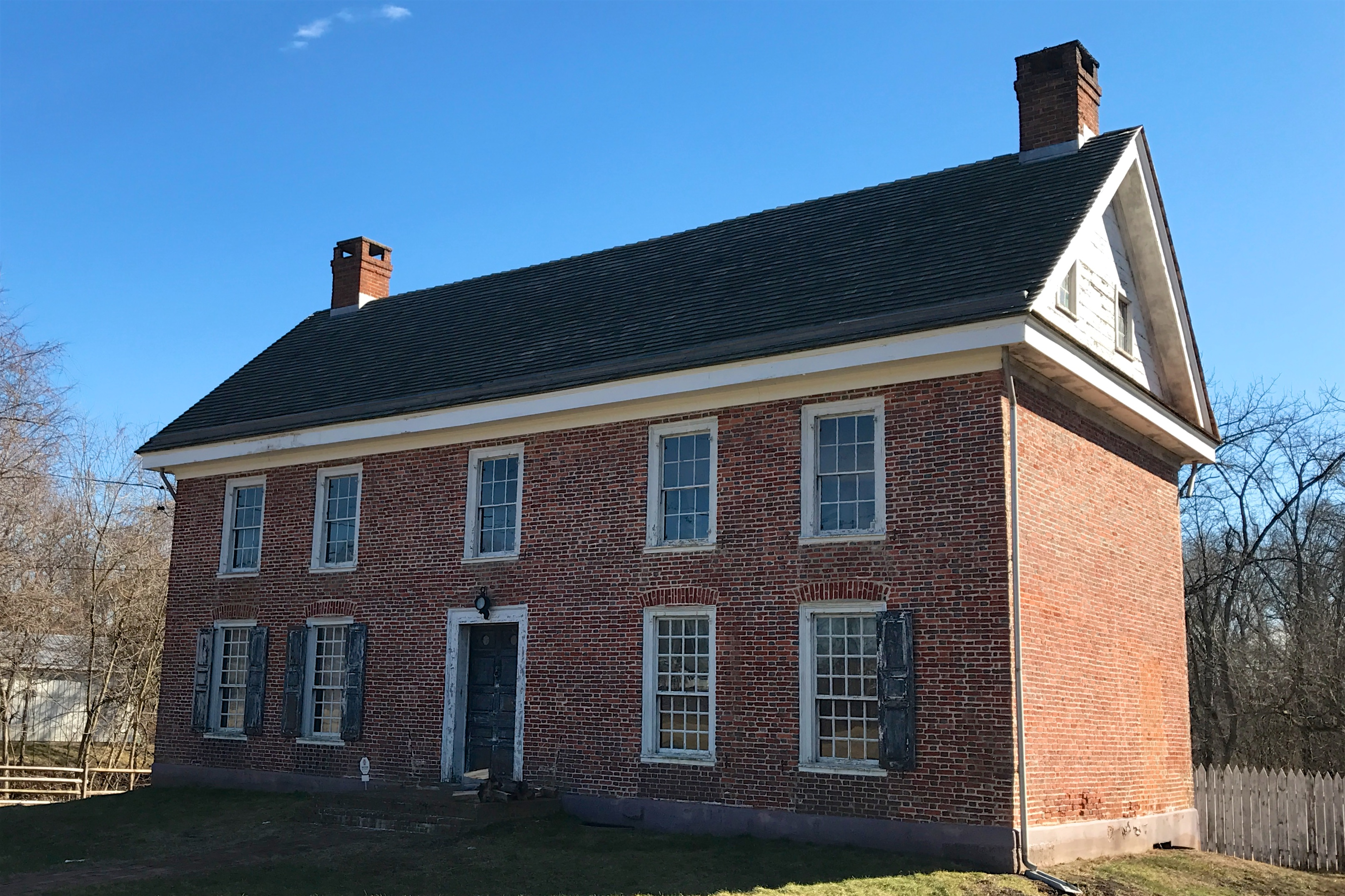
Old Dutch Parsonage

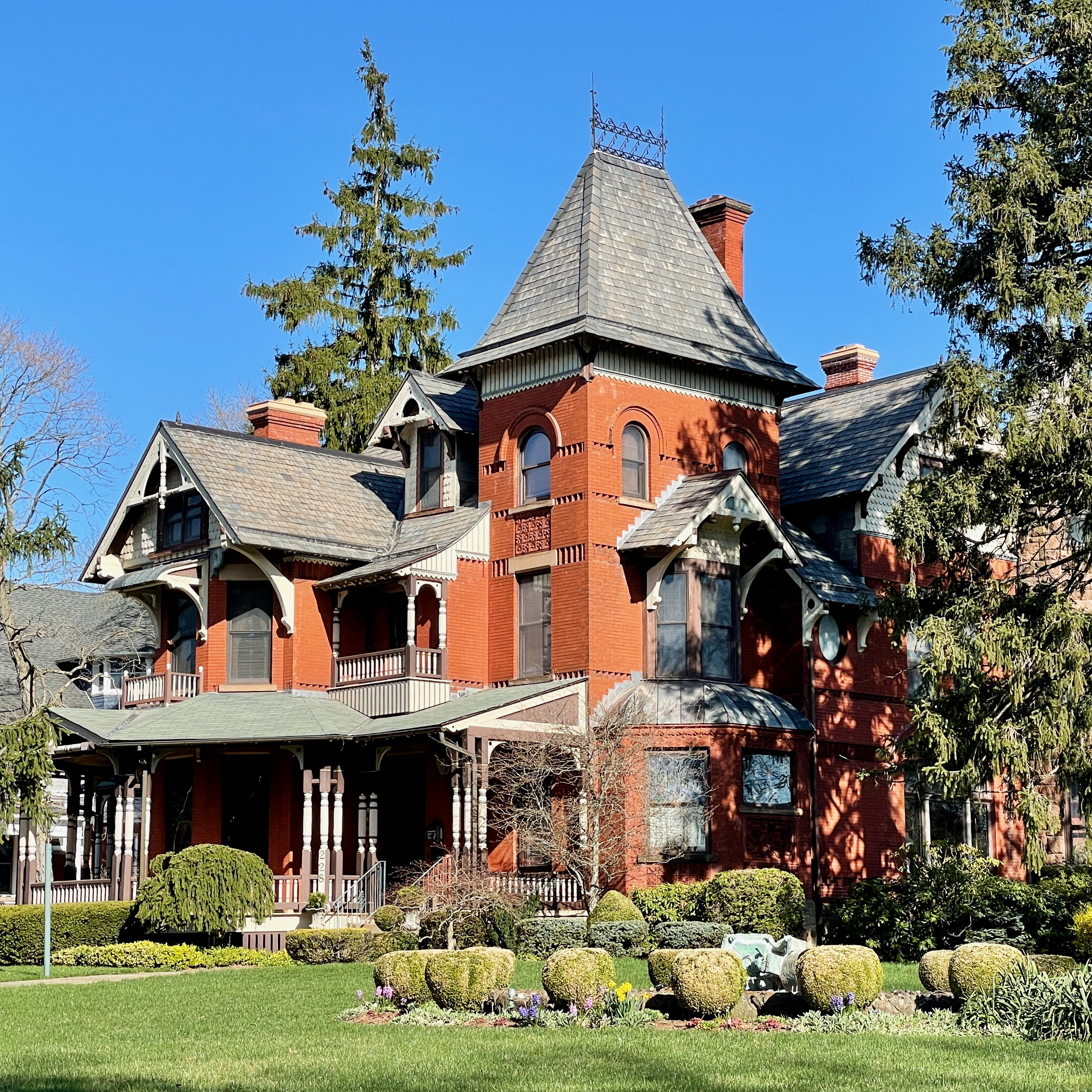
J. Harper Smith Mansion

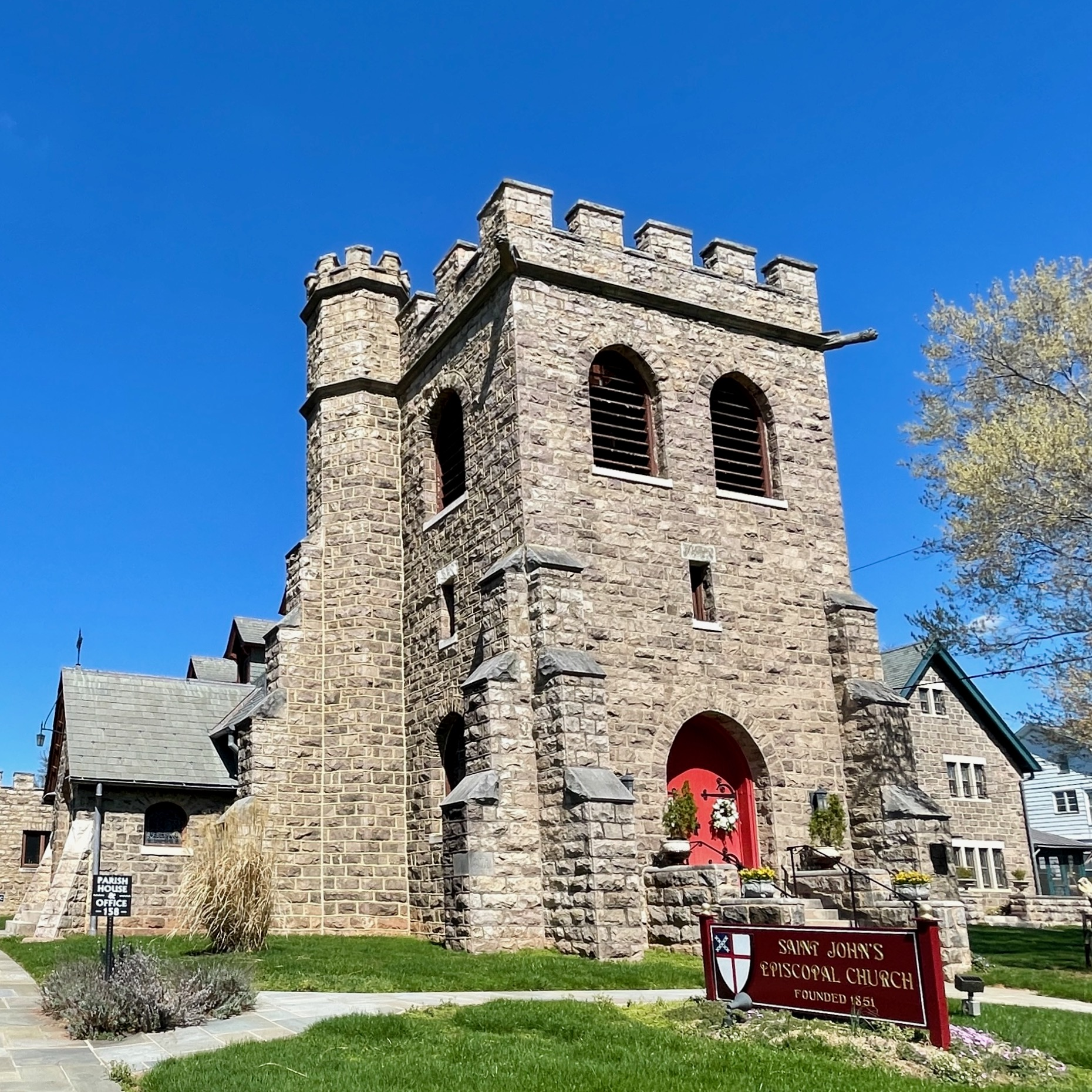
St. John's Episcopal Church

== Notable people ==
People who were born in, residents of, or otherwise closely associated with Somerville include:

- Alicia Albe (born 1977), competitor in rhythmic gymnastics
- Mary Ellicott Arnold (1876–1968), social activist, teacher and writer best known for her memoir In the Land of the Grasshopper Song
- Nicole Arendt (born 1969), professional tennis player
- Frank Asch (born 1946), author of children's literature
- Christopher "Kip" Bateman (born 1957), politician who has served in the New Jersey Senate from 2008-2022, where he represented the 16th Legislative District
- Raymond Bateman (1927–2016), politician who served in the New Jersey Senate in the 1960s and 1970s, who was the Republican nominee for Governor of New Jersey in 1977
- Daniel H. Beekman (1874–1951), Judge of the Somerset County Court of Common Pleas, President of the Second National Bank of Somerville, and Democratic politician
- James J. Bergen (1847–1924), politician who served as Speaker of the New Jersey General Assembly and an Associate Justice of the New Jersey Supreme Court
- Nicholas L. Bissell Jr. (1947–1996), county prosecutor of Somerset County who fled to Laughlin, Nevada, and took his own life after being charged with embezzlement, tax fraud and abuse of power
- George H. Brown (1810–1865), represented New Jersey's 4th congressional district in the United States House of Representatives from 1853 to 1855
- Tony Camillo (1928–2018), record producer and arranger
- Clarence E. Case (1877–1961), politician who served as acting Republican Governor of New Jersey in 1920, succeeding William Nelson Runyon
- Jack M. Ciattarelli (born 1961), entrepreneur and politician who represented the 16th Legislative District in the New Jersey General Assembly from 2011 to 2018
- Alvah A. Clark (1840–1912), represented New Jersey's 4th congressional district in the United States House of Representatives from 1877 to 1881
- Kate Claxton (1848–1924), stage actress
- Willie Cole (born 1955), contemporary sculptor, printer, and conceptual and visual artist
- Christine Danelson (born 1987), actress best known as the understudy for the role of Tracy in the national tour of the Broadway musical Hairspray
- Royal Page Davidson (1870–1943), educator and inventor
- John G. Demaray (1930–2015), medievalist
- Don Elliott (1926–1984), jazz trumpeter, vibraphonist, vocalist, and mellophone player
- David Felmley (1857–1930), educator who served for 30 years as president of Illinois State University, then known as Illinois State Normal University
- Lewis Van Syckle Fitz Randolph (1838–1921), businessman and politician
- Kevin Foley (born 1987), professional golfer
- Gene Freed (1930–2009), bridge player and physician
- Frederick Frelinghuysen (1753–1804), lawyer, soldier, and senator from New Jersey
- Mary Exton Gaston (1855–1956), first female physician in Somerville and a "major force in the borough's development"
- Frederick Wilson Hall (1908–1984), Associate Justice of the New Jersey Supreme Court from 1959 to 1975
- Reggie Harrison (born 1951), former professional American football running back for four seasons in the National Football League for the Pittsburgh Steelers and St. Louis Cardinals
- Mort Herbert (1925–1983), jazz bassist and lawyer
- Naomi Jakobsson (born 1941), member of the Illinois House of Representatives, representing the 103rd District since 2003
- Walter J. Kavanaugh (1933–2008), member of the State Senate who represented New Jersey's 16th Legislative District who had been a successful businessman in Somerville and a life member of the Somerville First Aid & Rescue Squad
- Joyce Kozloff (born 1942), artist whose politically engaged work has been based on cartography since the early 1990s
- Joe Lis (1946–2010), Major League Baseball player who played for Philadelphia, Minnesota, Cleveland and Seattle
- John Mack (1926–2006), principal oboist with the Cleveland Orchestra
- Eric Murdock (born 1968), NBA player for the Utah Jazz, Milwaukee Bucks, Vancouver Grizzlies, Denver Nuggets, Miami Heat, New Jersey Nets and Los Angeles Clippers
- Michael J. Newman (born 1960), United States magistrate judge in the Southern District of Ohio
- Steven J. Ostro (1946–2008), scientist specializing in radar astronomy
- Frank Perantoni (1923–1991), American football center who played professional football for the New York Yankees and later served on the Somerville borough council
- Arnold F. Riedhammer (born 1947), German-American musician, composer, and songwriter
- Helen Riehle (born 1950), politician who serves in the Vermont Senate, representing most of Chittenden County
- Paul Robeson (1898–1976), actor, athlete, bass-baritone concert singer, writer, civil rights activist, Fellow traveler, Spingarn Medal winner, and Stalin Peace Prize laureate
- Brian E. Rumpf (born 1964), politician who represents the 9th Legislative District in the New Jersey General Assembly
- Theodore Runyon (1822–1896), politician, diplomat, and American Civil War brigadier general in the New Jersey Militia
- Skinnyfromthe9 (born 1995), rapper and singer
- Frank Snook (born 1949), former relief pitcher who played for the San Diego Padres
- Ruth St. Denis (1879–1968), modern dance pioneer
- William Gaston Steele (1820–1892), represented New Jersey's 3rd congressional district from 1861 to 1865
- Douglas Urbanski, film producer
- Lee Van Cleef (1925–1989), WWII warhero (Bronze Star), painter and actor who was featured in The Good, the Bad and the Ugly, For a Few Dollars More, Escape from New York and many other films and TV series
- Fred Van Eps (1878–1960), banjoist and early recording artist
- Jeffrey Vanderbeek, former owner of the New Jersey Devils
- Mauricio Vargas (born 1992), soccer goalkeeper who plays for the Pittsburgh Riverhounds of the United Soccer League
- Frederica von Stade (born 1945), mezzo-soprano
- Daniel Spader Voorhees (1852–1935), New Jersey State Treasurer from 1907 to 1913
- Jon Williams (born 1961), NFL player for the New England Patriots
- Elvira Woodruff (born 1951), children's writer known for books that include elements of fantasy and history
- Elinor Wylie (1885–1928), poet and novelist, author of Angels and Earthly Creatures, The Orphan Angel and other works

== See also ==
- Somerville Public Library
