= Christine Danelson =

American actress

- Born: May 22, 1987 (age 39); Union County, New Jersey
- Education: Kean University (BM)
- Occupation: Actress
- Years active: 2006–present

Christine Danelson (born May 22, 1987) is an American actress best known as the understudy for the role of Tracy in the national tour of the Broadway musical Hairspray. Danelson performed as Tracy nearly 60 times during the tour, and was critically well-regarded, with one Reno reviewer commenting, "As Tracy, Danelson is the show's centerpiece and she's terrific."

Born in Union County and raised in Clark, Danelson attended Mother Seton Regional High School. She trained at the Paper Mill Playhouse in Millburn, New Jersey, and at the New Jersey Performing Arts Center in Newark, New Jersey.

Danelson has appeared in two Law & Order episodes and in two feature films, My Sassy Girl and Burn Card. In 2010, she graduated cum laude from Kean University in Union, New Jersey where she was named the 2008 Kean Idol.

In June 2010, Christine Danelson was a part of the Off-Broadway production of Cloaked, a retelling of Little Red Riding Hood. Later that year, she starred as the lead in Hairspray at the Paper Mill Playhouse. Christine was very well received at the Paper Mill and received many outstanding reviews. Peter Filichia of The Star-Ledger suggested that show was better than Broadway stating:

One reason Hairspray is more believable in Millburn is Christine Danelson. While she dons the requisite fat suit to display Tracy’s girth, Danelson is one of the most attractive young women to have played the role. And she seems to go from one frenetic dance number to the next without shedding even a single bead of perspiration."

The New York Times also offered its opinion of Danelson's performance at the Paper Mill:

"A young veteran of the show’s national tour, Christine Danelson is a joyful sweetheart as Tracy, with a mischievous Bette Midleresque face and a strong, yet fittingly cooing voice. Effortlessly gyrating through the dances — even when she snapped a shoe strap during the finale on opening night — Ms. Danelson blesses Tracy with a touch of vulnerability that makes viewers root for her ingenuous character’s triumph over Baltimore’s racism and skinnier girls."

Danelson has been a resident of Somerville, New Jersey.
