= Arnold F. Riedhammer =

German-American musician, composer and songwriter

Arnold F. Riedhammer (born 1947 in Somerville, New Jersey, USA) is a German-American musician, composer, and songwriter. He is Principal Percussionist of the Munich Philharmonic Orchestra and the group Blechschaden.

== Biography ==
Arnold F. Riedhammer, percussionist and composer much sought after in the fields of classical music as well as rock, pop and jazz, was born in Somerville, New Jersey, USA, of German-American parents. From 1966 to 1970, he studied at the Richard Strauss Conservatory in Munich, passing his final examination with honours in 1970. After working as a solo timpanist in Nuremberg and Bonn, Riedhammer has been the solo percussionist with the Munich Philharmonic Orchestra since 1974. He is also a teacher of percussion at the University of Music in Munich. Numerous students of his class have received positions in top orchestras throughout Europe and Asia.

1980: soloist examination at the National Academy of Music Trossingen (instrument: solo percussion). 1981: National Sponsorship Award for percussion – the first time ever a percussionist received this award.

Numerous TV, radio and record productions featuring percussion concerts, for example, with Munich Philharmonic Orchestra and the Bamberg Symphony Orchestra. Riedhammer wrote several title songs and music for commercials commissioned by the Bavaria Broadcasting Co. He also wrote several percussion pieces for ZIMMERMANN/Frankfurt and STUDIO 4 MUSIC/Los Angeles, Mostly Marimba and Kendor Music, Inc. USA

As a classical percussionist he has performed, for example, with Leonard Bernstein, Sergiu Celebidache, Herbert von Karajan, Seiji Ozawa, Sir Georg Solti, Zubin Mehta, James Levine, Lorin Maazel, Christian Thielemann etc.

In the field of pop and rock music, he has recorded and toured with: The Rolling Stones, Freddie Mercury and Queen, Liza Minnelli, Liberace, Chris de Burgh, Donna Summer, Randy Crawford, Henry Mancini, Jerry Goldsmith, Elmer Bernstein, Lawrence Rosenthal etc.

Additionally, Arnold gives clinics, courses and workshops and plays solo percussion concerts both in Germany and abroad.

Arnold F. Riedhammer's Solo-CD PERCUSSION GOES POP KOCH CLASSICS 3-6413-2

He is the drummer of a European group called “Blechschaden”, who won the German Grammy Award “Echo Prize” twice and play around 60 concerts throughout Europe every year.

Arnold is an endorser of DW drums, ZILDJIAN cymbals and gongs, REMO heads, his own PROMARK Signature Stick, ROLAND V-drums, MEINL Percussion, Pure Sound Snare strainer.

=== Works ===
„The Challenge“ for Solo Snare Drum, publisher Zimmermann Frankfurt „Drums for Fun“, publisher Zimmermann Frankfurt „Rudimental Rumble“, publisher MostlyMarimba USA “Groovin’ Timps”, publisher MostlyMarimba USA “Duel” (Percussion duel), publisher Kendor Music, Inc. USA “Good Vibe-Brations” Solo for Vibraphon, publisher Kendor Music, Inc. USA „Rudimental Rumble Duet, publisher AFR Music – Munich – Germany „Rudimental Groove, publisher AFR Music – Munich – Germany “London Timps”, publisher AFR Music – Munich – Germany

=== External links ===
- Official site
- http://www.arnoldriedhammer.de
- http://www.arnoldriedhammer.com
- http://www.blechschaden.de
