= St. John's Episcopal Church (Somerville, New Jersey) =

Historic church in New Jersey, United States

- St. John's Church Complex
- U.S. National Register of Historic Places
- New Jersey Register of Historic Places
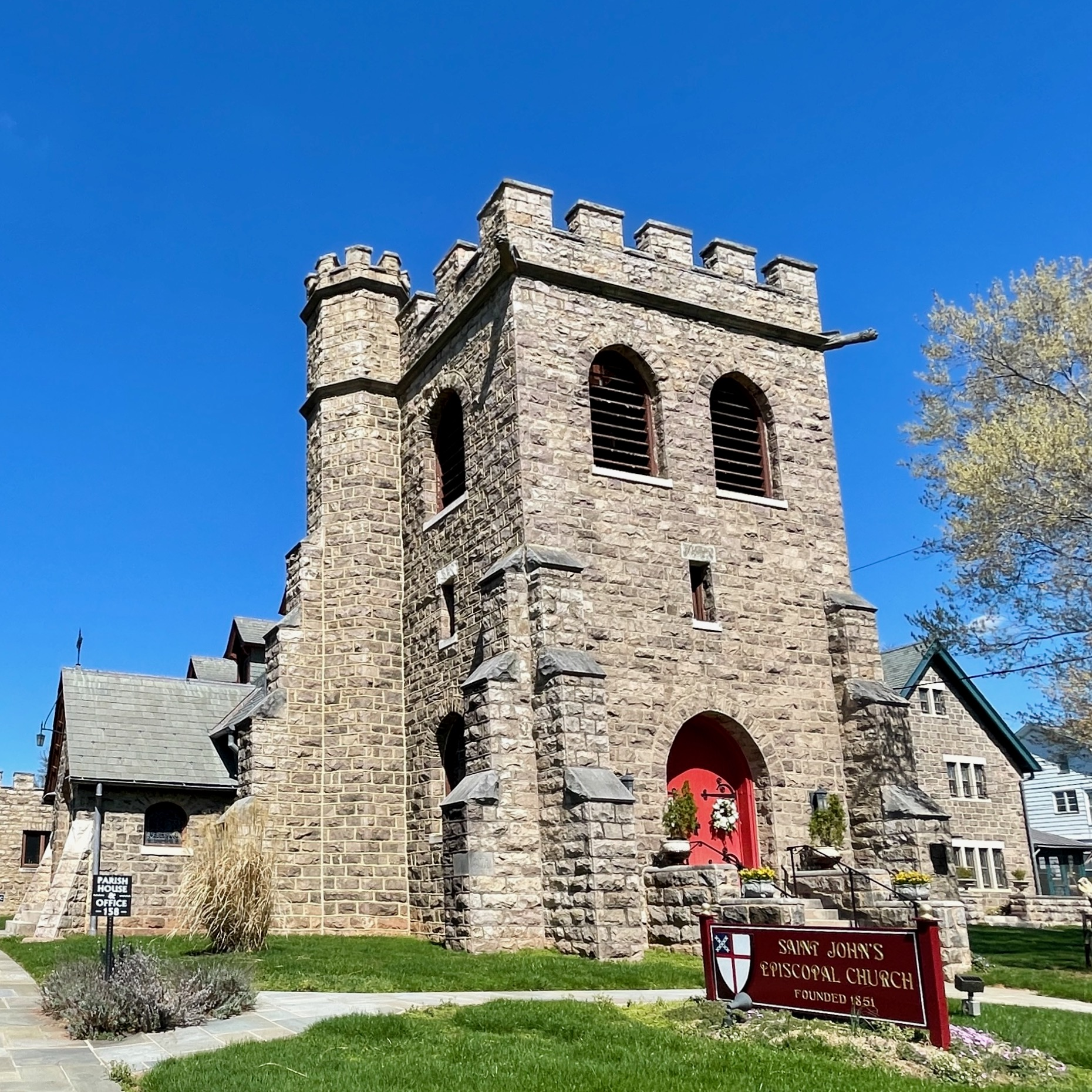
- St. John's Episcopal Church in 2021

- Location within Somerset County, New Jersey Location within New Jersey Location within the United States
- Location: 154–158 W. High Street, Somerville, New Jersey
- Coordinates: 40°34′20″N 74°37′03″W
- Area: 1.7 acres (0.69 ha)
- Built: 1895
- Architect: Horace Trumbauer
- Architectural style: Late Gothic Revival
- NRHP reference No.: 03000933
- NJRHP No.: 4199

Significant dates
- Added to NRHP: September 15, 2003
- Designated NJRHP: May 30, 2003

St. John's Episcopal Church is a historic church located at 154–158 W. High Street in the borough of Somerville in Somerset County, New Jersey. Built in 1895, it was designed by architect Horace Trumbauer in Early English Gothic style. St. John's Church Complex, which includes the church, rectory, and parish hall, was added to the National Register of Historic Places on May 30, 2003 for its significance in architecture and social history.

== History and description ==
The congregation was founded in 1850 and built a wooden church building. It was replaced by the current church, built in 1895 using Stockton sandstone with Early English Gothic style designed by the architect Horace Trumbauer. He also designed the rectory, which features Shingle style architecture and is built with the same sandstone. J. Harper Smith, a Somerville businessman, was the primary donor for the church, contributing US$5,000 (equivalent to $186,000 in 2025) to the building fund. The Parish Hall, also known as Guild Hall, was built in 1924 and expanded in 1959.

== Gallery ==
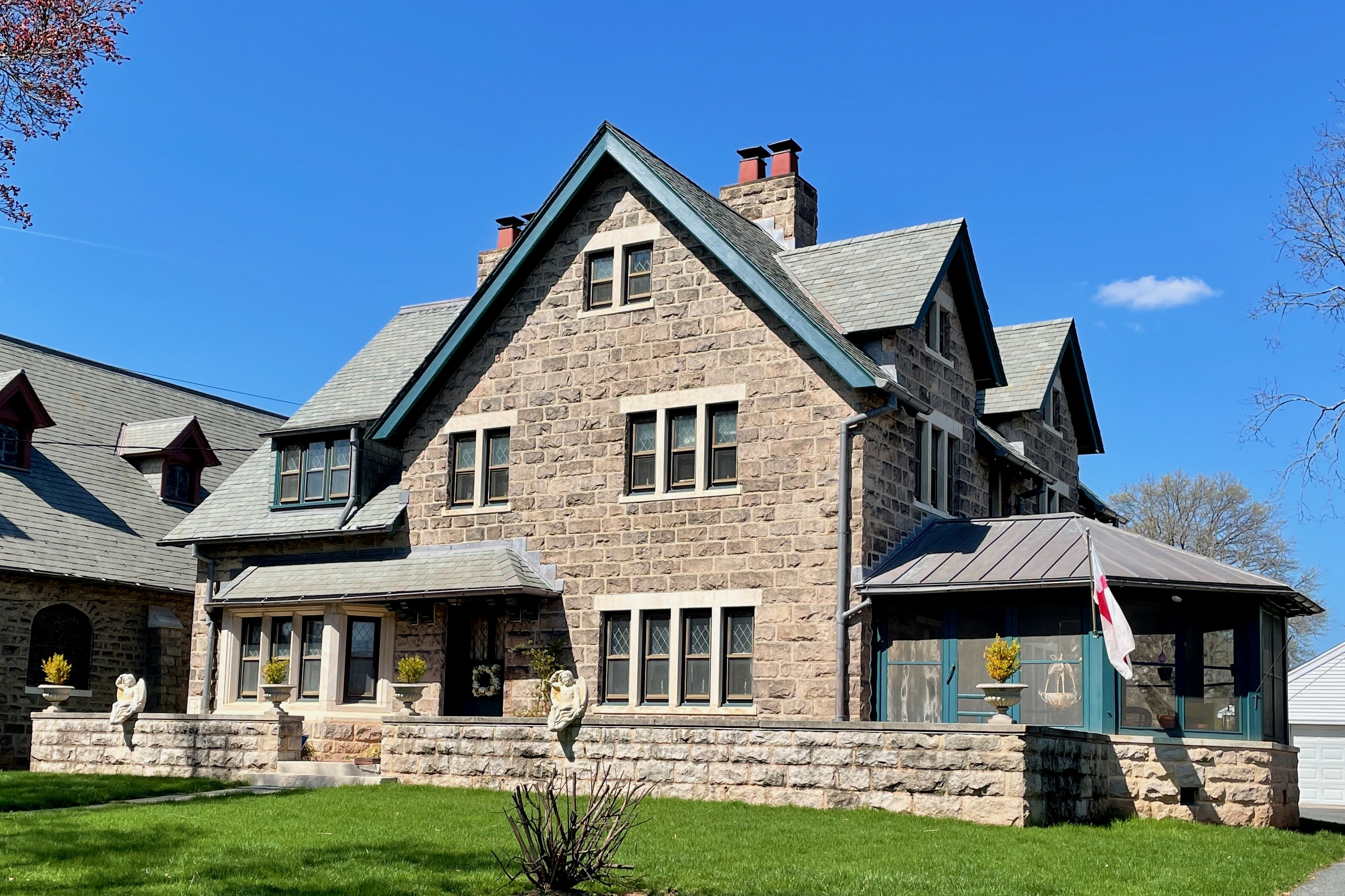
Rectory

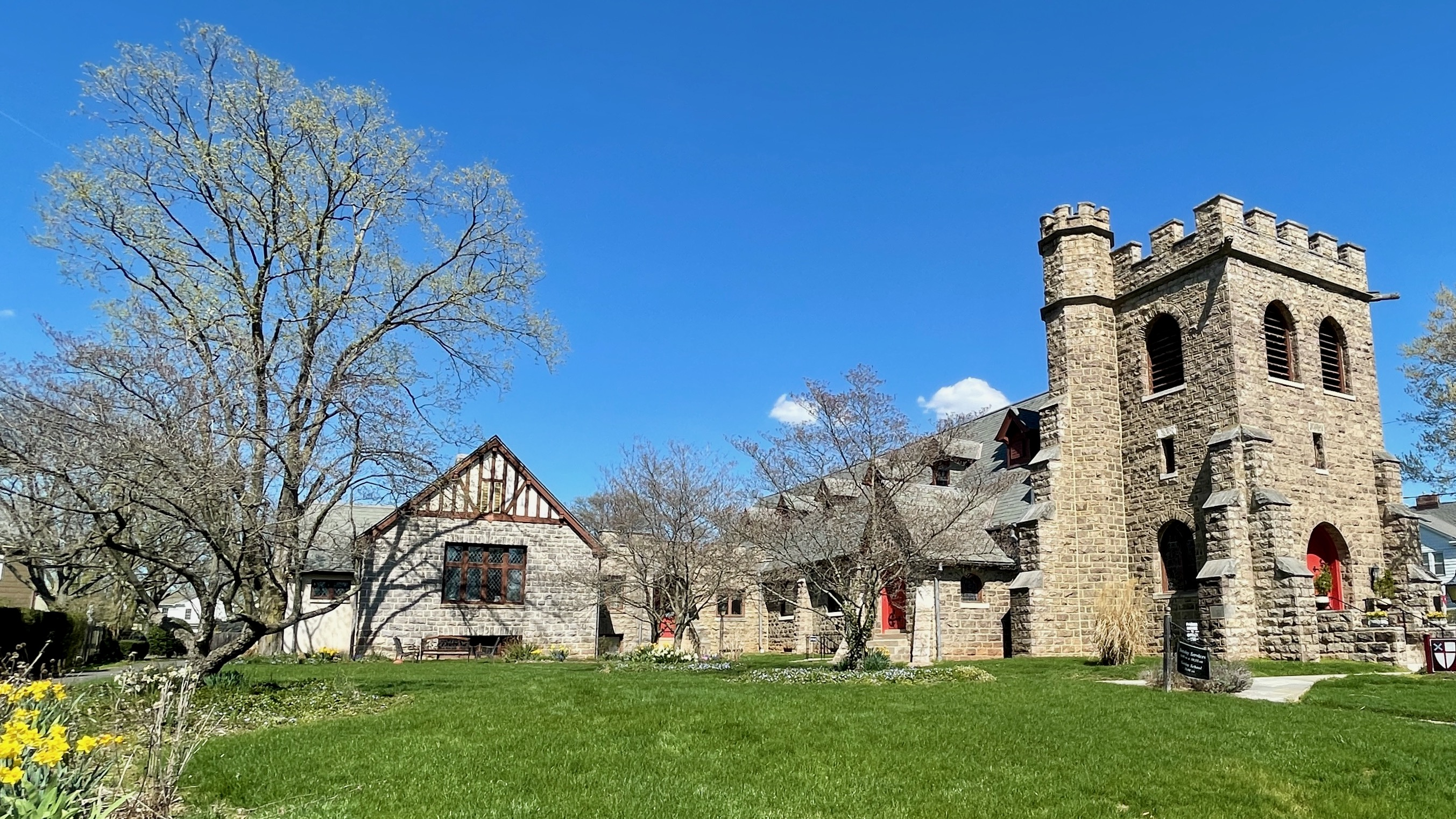
Parish Hall and Church

== See also ==
- National Register of Historic Places listings in Somerset County, New Jersey
