= Mother Seton Regional High School =

High school in Union County, New Jersey, United States

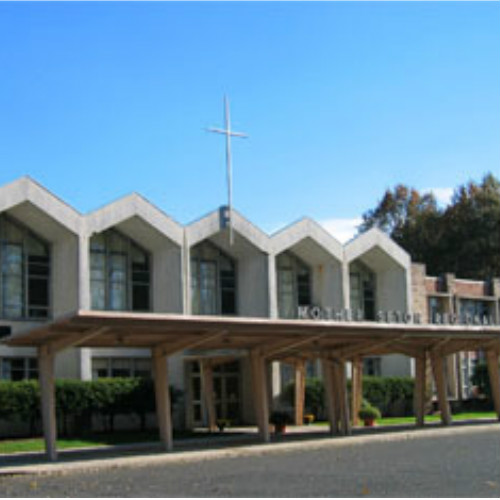
- Mother Seton Regional High School

Location
- 1 Valley Road; Clark, (Union County), New Jersey 07066; United States; 40°37′32″N 74°18′12″W

Information
- Type: Private, all-girls
- Religious affiliations: Roman Catholic, Sisters of Charity
- Patron saint: St. Elizabeth Ann Seton
- Established: 1963
- NCES School ID: 00861321
- Principal: Jacquelyn Balasia
- Faculty: 21.5 FTEs
- Grades: 9–12
- Enrollment: 181 (as of 2023–24)
- Student to teacher ratio: 8.4:1
- Campus size: 27 acres (11 ha)
- Colors: Red and Gold
- Slogan: The Future is Hers
- Athletics conference: Greater Middlesex Conference
- Team name: Setters
- Accreditation: Middle States Association of Colleges and Schools
- Publication: Driftwood (literary magazine)
- Newspaper: Setonaire
- Yearbook: Sojourn
- Tuition: $21,000 (2026–27)
- Website: www.motherseton.org

Mother Seton Regional High School (often referred to as Mother Seton) is an all-girl Catholic high school located in Clark, in Union County, New Jersey, United States. It is located in the Roman Catholic Archdiocese of Newark. The school has been accredited by the Middle States Association of Colleges and Schools Commission on Elementary and Secondary Schools since 1971. The school is staffed by the Sisters of Charity of Convent Station, New Jersey, and lay faculty members. The school occupies a two-level building located on a campus of 27 acres (110,000 m^{2}).

As of the 2023–24 school year, the school had an enrollment of 181 students and 21.5 classroom teachers (on an FTE basis), for a student–teacher ratio of 8.4:1. The school's student body was 34.3% (62) White, 23.8% (43) Black, 19.9% (36) Hispanic, 11.0% (20) two or more races, 10.5% (19) Asian and 0.6% (1) American Indian / Alaska Native.

== History ==
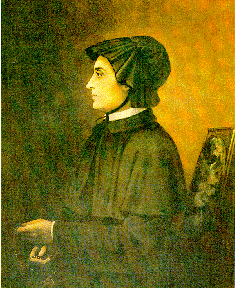
Saint Elizabeth Ann Seton (Mother Seton), patron saint of Mother Seton Regional High School.

=== 1963-1970 ===
Mother Seton Regional High School officially opened on September 16, 1963, with only the second floor wing being functional. The first class was 115 female students. On February 1, 1964, the new convent was officially moved into with the 1964 school year consisting of two priests and five sisters serving as faculty for 215 students. For the 1964–65 school year, the faculty was expanded to ten sisters, four priests and four lay teachers for 325 enrolled students. Sister Irene Margaret Vopelak was voted as the first principal, later hosting the first mass of the school in October 1964. Reverend Thomas A. Boland, S.T.D., Archbishop of Newark, laid the cornerstone of the convent in 1965.

The 1965–66 school year was marked by faculty expansion to include 5 priests, 12 sisters, and the addition of lay teachers for the student body of 565 students. Homemaking, Art, Music, Drivers Ed, and business programs were expanded with the first visit to Emmitsburg being hosted that year, a trip to honor Mother Seton, the school's patron. The school saw a brief shutdown during Vatican II with the 1966–67 school year increasing the student body to 775 students. 1969 saw the expansion of the student body to 955 students with a faculty size of 65 teachers. In 1970, Mother Seton Regional High School received accreditation from the Middle States Association of Colleges and Schools and began their first computer classes.

=== 1975-1984 ===
In 1975, Sister Martin Keane was named the second principal of Mother Seton. This year further saw the canonization of the school's patron saint, Mother Seton. In 1979, the Middle States accreditation was extended for 10 additional years and, in 1981, the New Jersey Department of Education reviewed and updated Mother Seton Regional High School's facilities and curriculum. In 1983, Mother Seton celebrated its 20th anniversary with the play The Sound of Music and a symposium covering the school's previous 20 years. Bishop Dominic Marconi, D.D., Union County Vicar, presided over the anniversary mass. In 1984, the National Honor Society renamed its chapter to Sister Irene Margaret Chapter, in honor of their founding president.

=== 1987-1999 ===
In 1987, Mother Seton Regional High School entered into the Greater Middlesex County Athletic Conference, and saw expansion to their administrative departments. 1988 served as their 25th anniversary, marking the inception of a soccer team and the 25th anniversary mass presided over by Archbishop McCarrick. In 1990, Mother Seton received their third Middle States accreditation, extending it until 2000. The Archdiocese of Newark awarded 10 teachers at Mother Seton with the "Outstanding Educator of the Year" award between 1991 and 2001. The Seton Leadership Team was founded in 1995, a student ambassador program that would receive press coverage from Dana Tyler for their work in aiding in Pope John Paul II's Papal Mass in Giants Stadium. This group further had interactions with President Clinton and his wife. In 1999, a computer lab was built with internet capabilities being implemented into the school. Accreditation was extended an additional 10 years in 1999 and a new track program was implemented.

=== 2002-Present ===
In 2002, Mother Seton formed a forensics team that later qualified for national competition in Washington, D.C. In 2003, Mother Seton celebrated its 40th anniversary with Archbishop Meyers presiding over the anniversary liturgy. This celebration led to the formation of the Seton Music Ensemble. In 2004, Mother Seton High School was the recipient of the Archdiocesan Sesquicentennial Medal of Honor. In 2005, principal Sister Regina Martin was one of 6 recipients of an award presented by The National Catholic Association's national convention. Assistant Principal Sister Jacquelyn Balasia became the first Sister of Charity to join the New Jersey Coaches Hall of Fame and received the Star Ledger Bowling Coach of the Year, GMC Blue Division Coach of the Year, Home News Tribune's Female Coach of the Year, and State Coach of the Year awards between 2006 and 2008. During the 2007–2008 school year, the fire and lighting systems were renovated and a new elevator and security system was implemented. This year also saw 8 Bloustein Scholars. Further renovations included the improvement of restrooms, improved drainage systems, and repaired parking lots.

In 2018, Mother Seton was placed on lock down after a vehicle chase that resulted in an overturned car and an individual being ejected. Two individuals fled the scene towards the school, resulting in it entering lock down status. The individuals were apprehended without incident. This event led to a series of schools in Central New Jersey updating security measures, including Mother Seton Regional High School. Mother Seton saw increased security measures and updated policies, with further discussion alongside the Archdiocese of Newark on future protocols. That same year, students and faculty participated in a nationwide protest against gun violence, honoring the 17 victims of the Marjory Stoneman Douglas High School shooting in Parkland, Florida. Mother Seton students attended a rally involving a video from Cardinal Tobin. After this, students proceeded outside and gathered in prayer around a statue of Saint Elizabeth Anne Seton. This service included the Prayer of Saint Francis of Assisi and reflections on Psalm Prayers. This event was supported and planned by the Archdiocese of Newark.

== Academics and Extracurriculars ==
=== Academics ===
Mother Seton Regional High School offers a four-year college preparatory curriculum, and the academic program provides emphasis on math and science. The school also offers honors programs and AP classes. In 2016, the graduating class received 16 million dollars in scholarships and since 2000, graduating classes have maintained an average of 97% of all students going in to higher education.

=== Athletics ===
The Mother Seton Regional High School Setters compete in the Greater Middlesex Conference, which operates under the supervision of the New Jersey State Interscholastic Athletic Association. With 346 students in grades 10–12, the school was classified by the NJSIAA for the 2019–20 school year as Non-Public B for most athletic competition purposes, which included schools with an enrollment of 37 to 366 students in that grade range (equivalent to Group I for public schools).

Sports offered include:

Soccer, Tennis, Volleyball, Bowling, Basketball, Swimming, Softball, Track and Field, Cross Country and Golf.

The girls bowling team won the Group II state championship in 2007.

== Controversy ==
=== Priest sexual assault allegations ===
In 2018, the Catholic Church released the names of 5,800 clergy members in the United States who were accused of sexual abuse. Father Alan Gugliemo, a previous faculty member of Mother Seton Regional High School was named alongside 186 New Jersey priests as being "credibly accused" of child sex abuse. As of 2018, Father Gugliemo has been removed from the ministry and is currently under investigation by the Pennsylvania grand jury.

== Notable alumni ==
- Christine Danelson (born 1987), Broadway actress.
- Lady London (born 1995), rapper and songwriter
- Eliana Pintor Marin (born 1980), who represents the 29th Legislative District in the New Jersey General Assembly.
