= William Finnie =

William Finnie may refer to:

- William Finnie (mayor), 18th-century mayor of Williamsburg, Virginia
- William Finnie (MP) (1828–1899), member of the UK parliament
- William Finnie (professor), professor of business
