= Infantry Division Ferdinand von Schill =

- Infanterie-Division Ferdinand von Schill
- Active: 24 April 1945 – end of World War II
- Country: Nazi Germany
- Branch: German Army
- Type: Infantry
- Part of: 12th Army
- Patron: Ferdinand von Schill

The Infantry Division Ferdinand von Schill (German: Infanterie-Division Ferdinand von Schill) was an infantry division of the German Wehrmacht during World War II. It was formed in April 1945, within a month of the end of the war, and was among the last divisions fielded by the German army during the war.

The division was named after the Prussian commander at the Battle of Stralsund of 1809, Ferdinand von Schill (1776–1809).

== History ==
The Infantry Division Ferdinand von Schill was formed on 24 April 1945 by Sturmgeschützschule Burg personnel, the former Kampfgruppe Burg, and assigned to the 12th Army (Wenck). Its commander was Alfred Müller. Müller held the rank of Oberstleutnant (lieutenant colonel) and thus deviated from the typical Wehrmacht divisional commander in that he was not a general.

The division was the last infantry division fielded by the German Army in World War II. Its deployment was so late in the war that it does not even appear in the listings of the German military postal service.

At the end of the war, Infantry Division Ferdinand von Schill initially surrendered to American forces, but was handed over to the Soviets.
