= Linsing Grenadier Battalion =

Hessian unit of the American Revolutionary War

- Grenadierbataillon von Linsingen
- Active: 1776-1784
- Country: Landgraviate of Hesse-Kassel
- Allegiance: British Crown
- Branch: Army of the Landgraviate of Hesse-Kassel
- Type: Infantry
- Role: Grenadiers
- Size: Four companies
- Part of: Hessian Grenadier Brigade
- Engagements: Long Island, Mount Holly, Bound Brook, Short Hills, Brandywine Creek, White Plains, Germantown, Fort Mercer, Monmouth Court House, Savannah, Charleston

Commanders
- Notable commanders: Lieutenant-colonel Otto Christian von Linsingen

The Linsing Grenadier Battalion (German: Grenadierbataillon von Linsingen) was a battalion in the grenadier brigade of the troops sent by the Landgraviate of Hesse-Kassel to fight as auxiliaries alongside British forces in North America during the American Revolutionary War.

== Formation and disbandment ==
The Linsingen Grenadier Battalion was formed in January 1776 in Wolfhagen and Immenhausen from the grenadier companies of the 2nd and 3rd Guards Regiments, the Life Regiment and the von Mirbach Regiment. It embarked in Bremer Lehe with the Block (later Lengerke) and Minnigerode Grenadier Battalions at the beginning of April 1776. In November 1783, the grenadier battalions began their journey home and returned to German soil in April 1784. In Kassel, Linsingen's grenadier battalion was finally disbanded or divided among the original regiments.

== Operations in North America ==
Upon arrival in North America in August 1776, the Linsingen Grenadier Battalion and the Lengerke and the Minnigerode battalions were combined into a grenadier brigade under the command of Colonel von Donop. Around the turn of the year 1777, the Grenadier Brigade was reinforced by the Köhler (later Graf and Platte) Grenadier Battalion. The grenadiers were deployed primarily in the New York and New Jersey areas, but they also participated in an expedition to Pennsylvania. The battalion fought at Flatbush during the Battle of Long Island and at Chatterton Hill during the Battle of White Plains in 1776 and participated in the costly battles of Brandywine, Germantown and Redbank in 1777 and at Monmouth in 1778. In 1779, the Grenadier Brigade was shipped to South Carolina, arriving there in early February 1780. The troops participated in the battles around Savannah and Charleston (e.g., the storming of Fort Moultrie. The brigade was finally transferred back to New York in May/June 1780. An attempt to relieve Cornwallis's army was aborted in 1781.

== Commanders ==
Commanders of the Hessian Grenadier Brigade

- 1776 Colonel Count Carl Emil Ulrich von Donop
- 1779 Major-genera Heinrich Julius von Kospoth

Commander of the battalion

- 1776 Lieutenant-colonel Otto Christian von Linsingen

Company commanders in North America

- Flank company of 2nd Guards Battalion: 1776-1777 Captain von Eschwege, 1777-1783 Captain von Plessen
- Flank company of 3rd Guards Battalion: 1776-1777 Captain von Wurmb, 1777-1783 Captain von Webern
- Grenadier Company of Life Regiment Infantry: 1776-1778 Captain von Stamford, from 1778 Captain von Dincklage (later Major)
- Grenadier Company of Regiment von Mirbach/Jung von Lossberg: 1776-1783 Captain von Mallet; from 1 July 1783 transferred to Battalion von Lengerke as the 1st Company.
