= Battle of Bound Brook =

Part of the American Revolutionary War (1777)

- Part of the American Revolutionary War
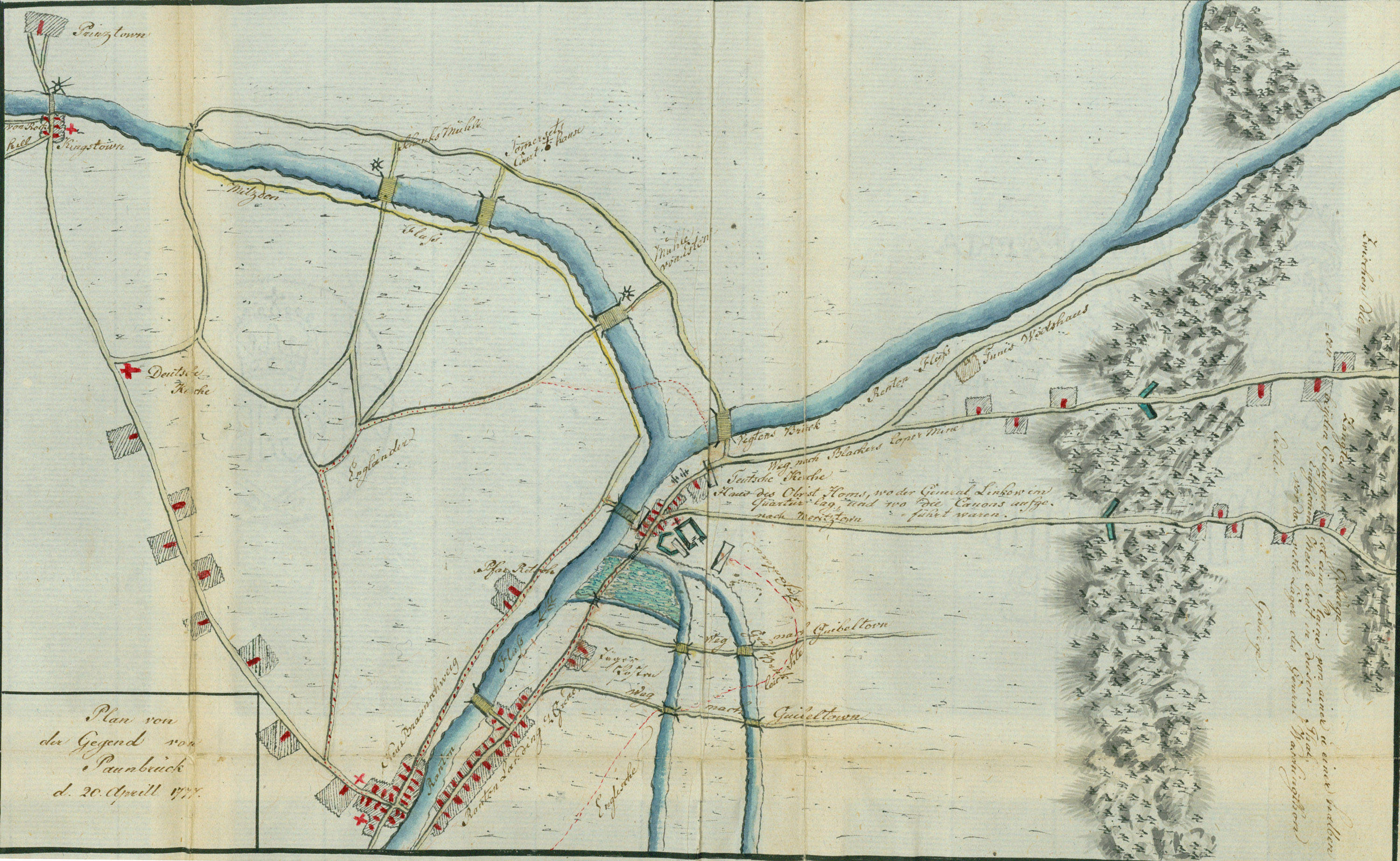
- Map by Johann Ewald depicting the Bound Brook area and the plan of attack. New Brunswick is at the bottom, and the Bound Brook outpost at the center. British movements are drawn in red.
Date	April 13, 1777
Location	Bound Brook, New Jersey, U.S. 40.5589°N 74.5278°W
Result	British victory

Belligerents
United States	Great Britain: Hesse-Cassel

Commanders and leaders
(United States) Benjamin Lincoln	(Kingdom of Great Britain) Charles Cornwallis

Strength
500	4,000

Casualties and losses
Reports vary: 40 to 120 killed, wounded or captured	Light: 7 wounded

The Battle of Bound Brook (April 13, 1777) was a surprise attack by British and Hessian forces on a Continental Army outpost in Bound Brook, New Jersey, during the American Revolutionary War. The British defeated the garrison, whose troops were either captured or fled. U.S. commander Major General Benjamin Lincoln left quickly, abandoning papers and personal effects.

Late on the evening of April 12, 1777, four thousand British and Hessian troops under the command of Lieutenant General Charles Cornwallis marched from the British stronghold of New Brunswick. All but one detachment reached positions surrounding the outpost before the battle began near daybreak the next morning. During the battle, most of the 500-man garrison escaped by the unblocked route. U.S. reinforcements arrived in the afternoon, but not before the British plundered the outpost and began the return march to New Brunswick.

== Background ==
Following the Battles of Trenton and Princeton in December 1776 and January 1777, the Continental Army of Major General George Washington entered winter quarters in Morristown, New Jersey, while the British and German forces of Lieutenant General William Howe settled into winter quarters in New York City and northeastern New Jersey. Throughout the winter months, a guerrilla war of sorts went on, in which American militia companies, sometimes with Continental Army support, harassed British and German outposts and ambushed their foraging and raiding expeditions. One of the forward bases used for these operations was at Bound Brook, located on the Raritan River upriver from New Brunswick, the major British camp in New Jersey. The post was responsible for patrolling three bridges across the Raritan likely to be used by the British in moves against the main camp at Morristown.

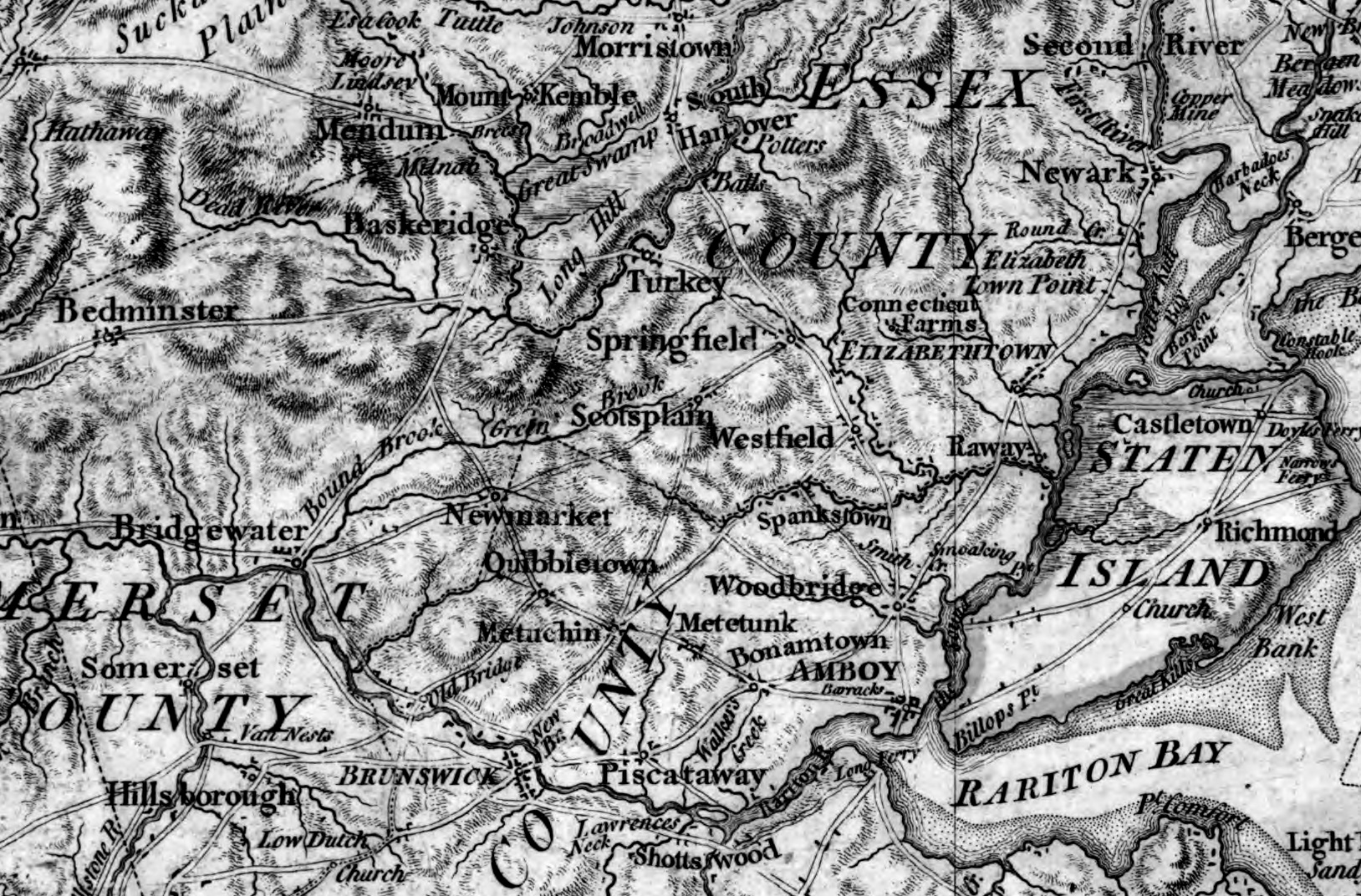
Detail from a 1777 map of the area. The Bound Brook outpost was near the spot labeled "Bridgewater" on this map.

In February 1777, the Bound Brook outpost consisted of 1,000 men under the command of Major General Benjamin Lincoln, but this was reduced by expiring militia enlistments to 500 in mid-March. The troops that remained included the 8th Pennsylvania Regiment, from the southwestern frontier counties of Westmoreland and Bedford, a company of the 4th Continental Artillery, a detachment of New Jersey militia, and two independent companies from the Wyoming Valley in what is now northeastern Pennsylvania, but then also claimed by Connecticut as Westmoreland County, Connecticut (not to be confused with Westmoreland County, Pennsylvania). Lincoln expressed concern over his exposed position to General Washington, noting that many units were not in a position to "render the least assistance to this post in case it is attacked", and that he was keeping wagons ready in case a precipitate departure was needed. Lieutenant General Lord Charles Cornwallis, in command of the British forces in New Jersey, had had enough of the ongoing petite guerre, and organized a reprisal action against the Bound Brook outpost. According to the Hessian jäger Captain Johann Ewald, Cornwallis asked him to draft a plan of attack on February 12, after the Battle of Quibbletown on February 8, but the plan could not be executed until springtime because it necessitated fording the Raritan. On the night of April 12, the plan was put into action.

== Battle ==
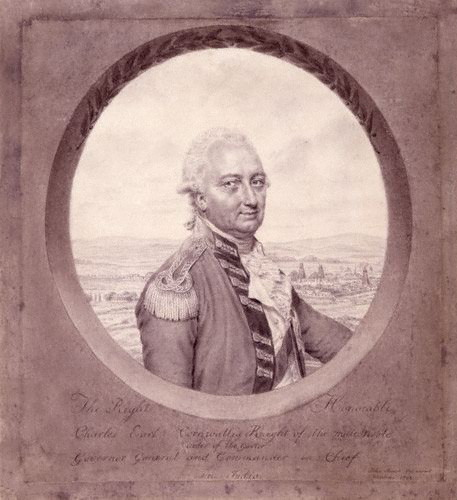
1792 portrait of Lord Cornwallis by John Smart

Under the overall command of Cornwallis, 4,000 British and Hessian troops marched from New Brunswick to make a multi-pronged surprise attack. The right flank, under the command of Major General James Grant, consisted of the Hessian Jäger corps, grenadiers from the English Brigade of Guards, and a detachment of British light dragoons. While most of this column advanced from Raritan Landing (opposite New Brunswick on the left, or Bound Brook side, of the river), two companies of light infantry went further right, aiming to cut off the main road from Bound Brook to the Continental Army camp at Morristown. The center, under the command of Hessian colonel, Carl von Donop, consisted of the Hessian grenadier battalions von Linsing and Minnigerode, and the left, commanded by Cornwallis, consisted of two battalions of British light infantry, the 1st battalion of grenadiers, and another detachment of light dragoons. Donop's column advanced up the right bank of the Raritan, aiming to gain control of the bridge directly at Bound Brook, while Cornwallis took a longer route to ford the river above Bound Brook and thus cut off the possibility of retreat in that direction.

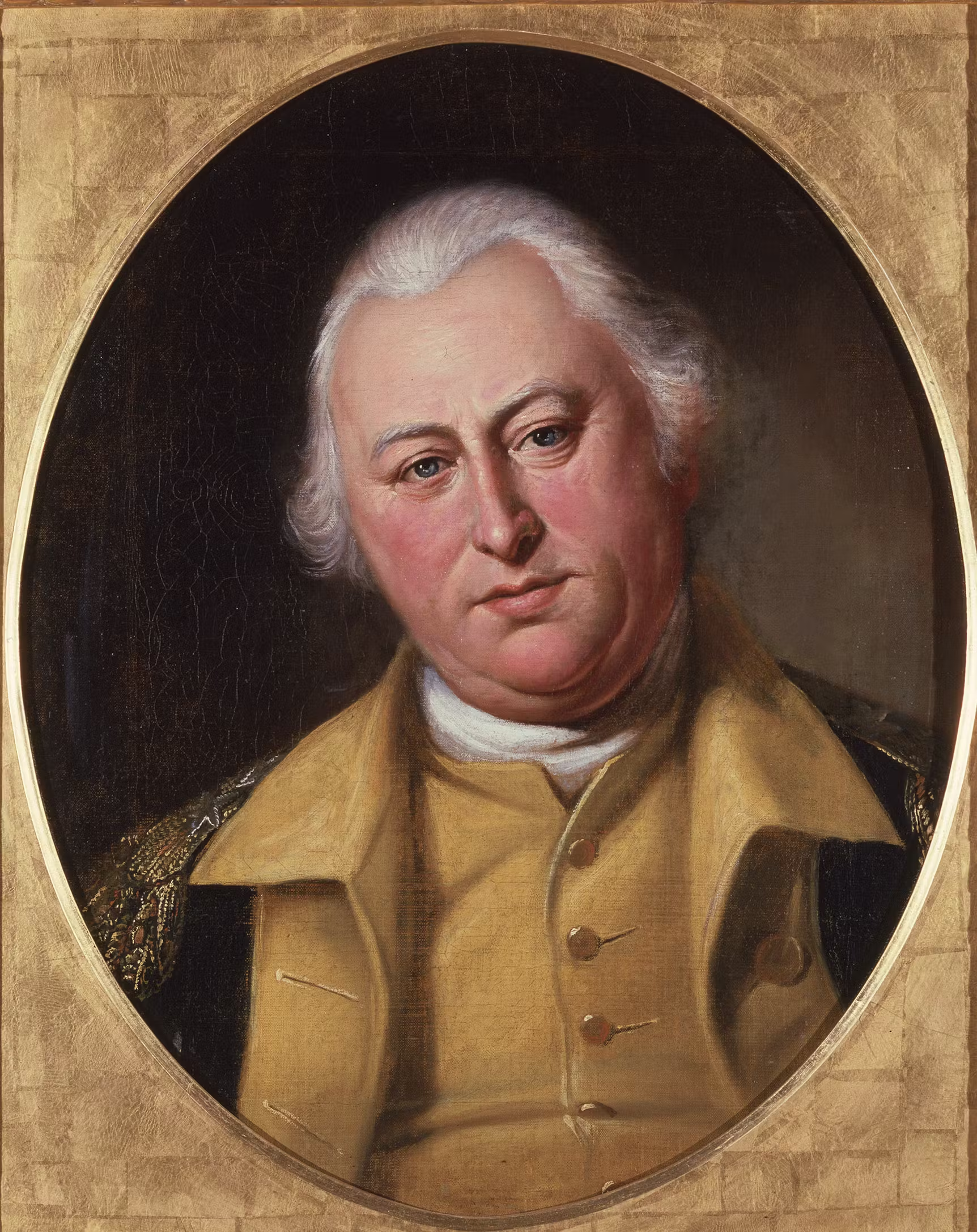
1784 portrait of Benjamin Lincoln by Charles Willson Peale

Ewald and a few of his Jäger were in the vanguard of Grant's column and engaged the American sentries to the south of Bound Brook. Unaware that this was supposed to be a feint, Ewald drove the sentries back nearly to the main redoubt where the outpost's cannons were located. By sunrise he was nearly surrounded; the timely arrival of von Donop's column just over the river, and the attack by Cornwallis's column prompted the Americans to begin abandoning the post. The surprise was very nearly complete; the Pennsylvania artillery company, which had been manning the redoubt, was severely mauled, with numerous killed and captured. Colonel von Donop reported that General Lincoln "must have retired en Profond Négligé" ("profoundly undressed", or naked), and Lincoln's papers were taken. The British plan was marred by the early skirmishing involving Ewald, and the too-late arrival of the companies sent to cut off the road to Morristown; many Americans escaped via this route. The British also captured cannons, ammunition, and supplies, and looted Bound Brook, but returned to New Brunswick later that morning.

== Aftermath ==
The Continental Army response was immediate; Washington sent a large force under Major General Nathanael Greene to reoccupy Bound Brook. The British had already left by the time they arrived; Greene sent a detachment to harass their rear guard. This detachment caught up with the British near Raritan Landing, where they killed 8 and captured 16.

General Howe reported that about 30 Americans were killed and 80 to 90 were captured, while General Lincoln reported that 60 of his men were killed or wounded. Howe claimed no deaths and seven wounded among the British and Hessians. Washington reported that "[t]he enemy lost the post at Eleven O'Clock the same day, & our people took possession of it again", and that the army's losses were "trifling and not worth mentioning". He did, however, also report that between 35 and 40 killed or captured, and the loss of three field cannons. In a report to the Board of War, Washington admitted the capture of two cannons, two officers and 20 men from Colonel Proctor's Regiment. General Greene reported to his wife, "The British Generals breakfasted and I [dined] at the same house that day". This event happened at the Van Horne House, also known as Convivial Hall.

Washington, concerned that the attack presaged an early start to the campaign season, worried that his troops were not yet in place to deal with major British movements. Two weeks later, after no further major activity, the Americans learned that "the Enemy are to take the field the first of June."

Washington recognized that Bound Brook itself was a difficult place to defend. On May 26 he withdrew the garrison, and on May 28, he moved part of his army from Morristown to a new entrenched camp near Middle Brook, just north of Bound Brook but well protected between the first and second Watchung Mountain ranges; other troops were stationed near Princeton. From the top of the Watchung Mountains, Washington monitored British movements while the two sides continued to skirmish. Both sides also engaged in intelligence gathering, each trying to determine the strength and intentions of the other.

On June 12 Howe marched a significant force (more than 18,000 men) out of New Brunswick, through Bound Brook, and as far as Somerset, apparently in an attempt to draw Washington out of the hills. Washington, aware that Howe had left the army's heavy baggage behind, was not fooled and refused to move. Howe then abruptly retreated back to Piscataway on June 19, upon which Washington had some of his troops give chase, and he moved down out of the hills. A week later Howe tried to spring a trap on one of Washington's detachments that would have cut off the American retreat into the hills; this effort was repulsed in the Battle of Short Hills. After this failure, Howe embarked his army on transports and set sail for Chesapeake Bay, intending to take Philadelphia from the south.

== Gallery ==
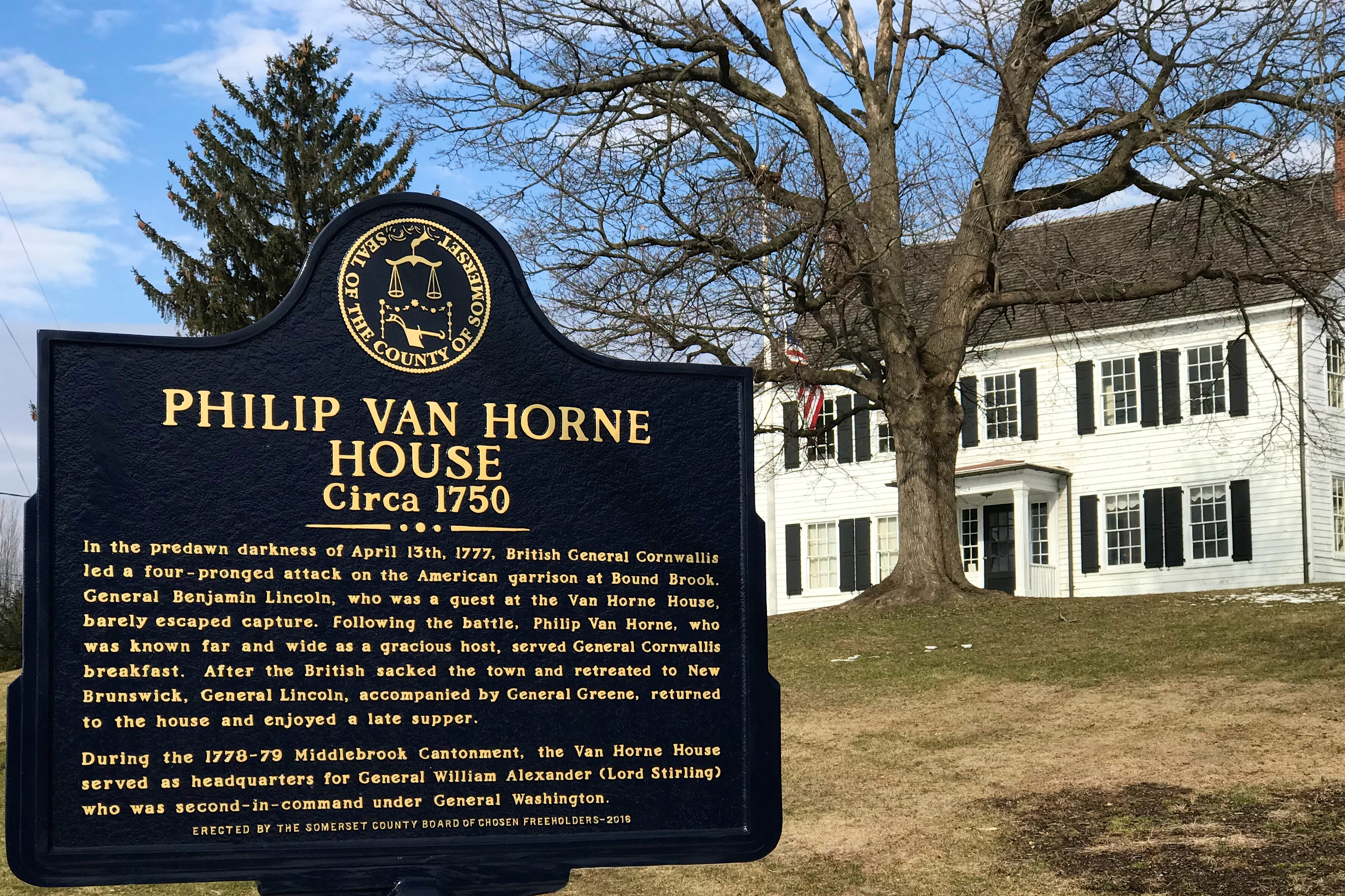
Van Horne House, headquarters of General Benjamin Lincoln

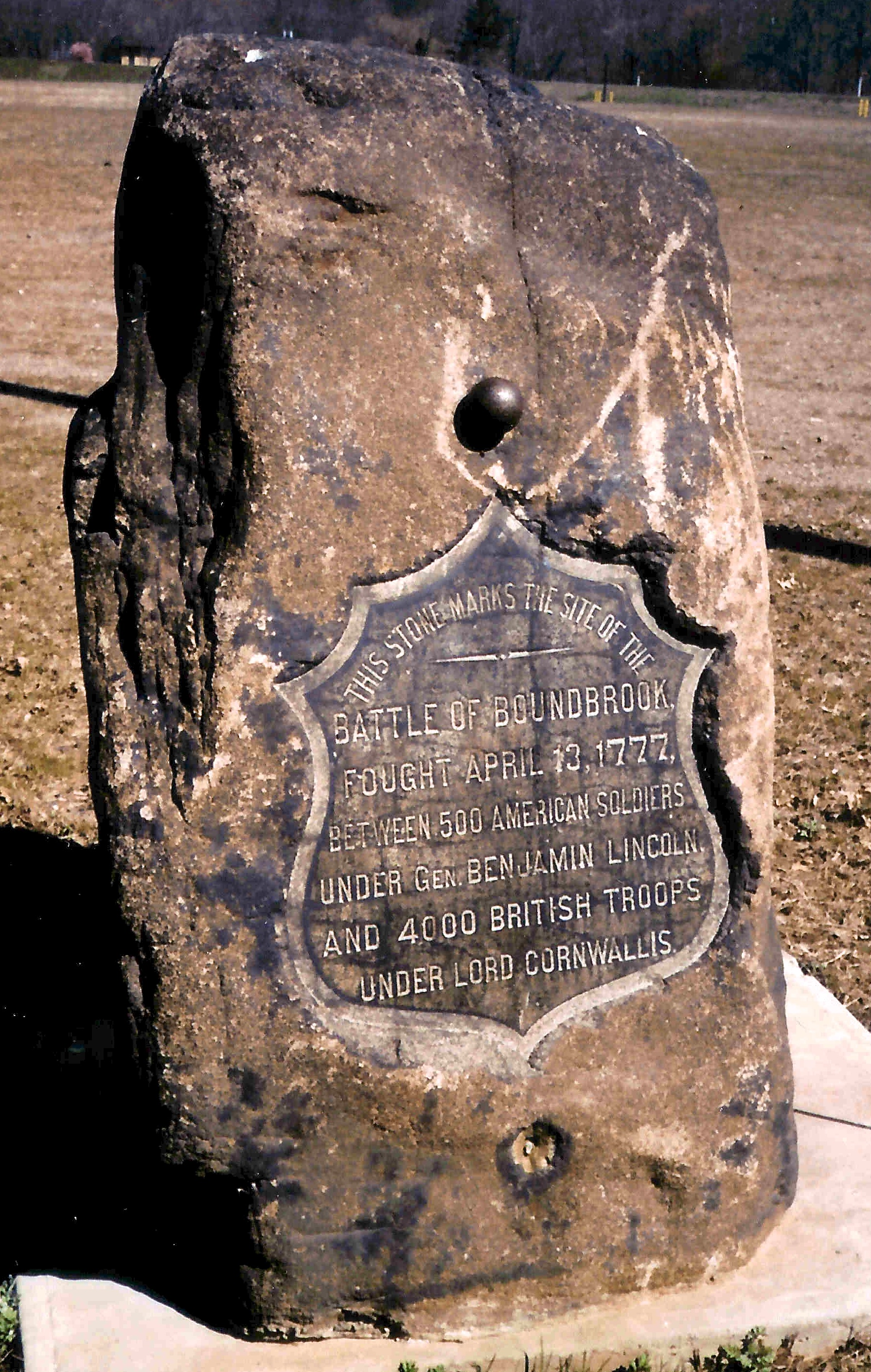
Battle plaque in Billian Legion Park

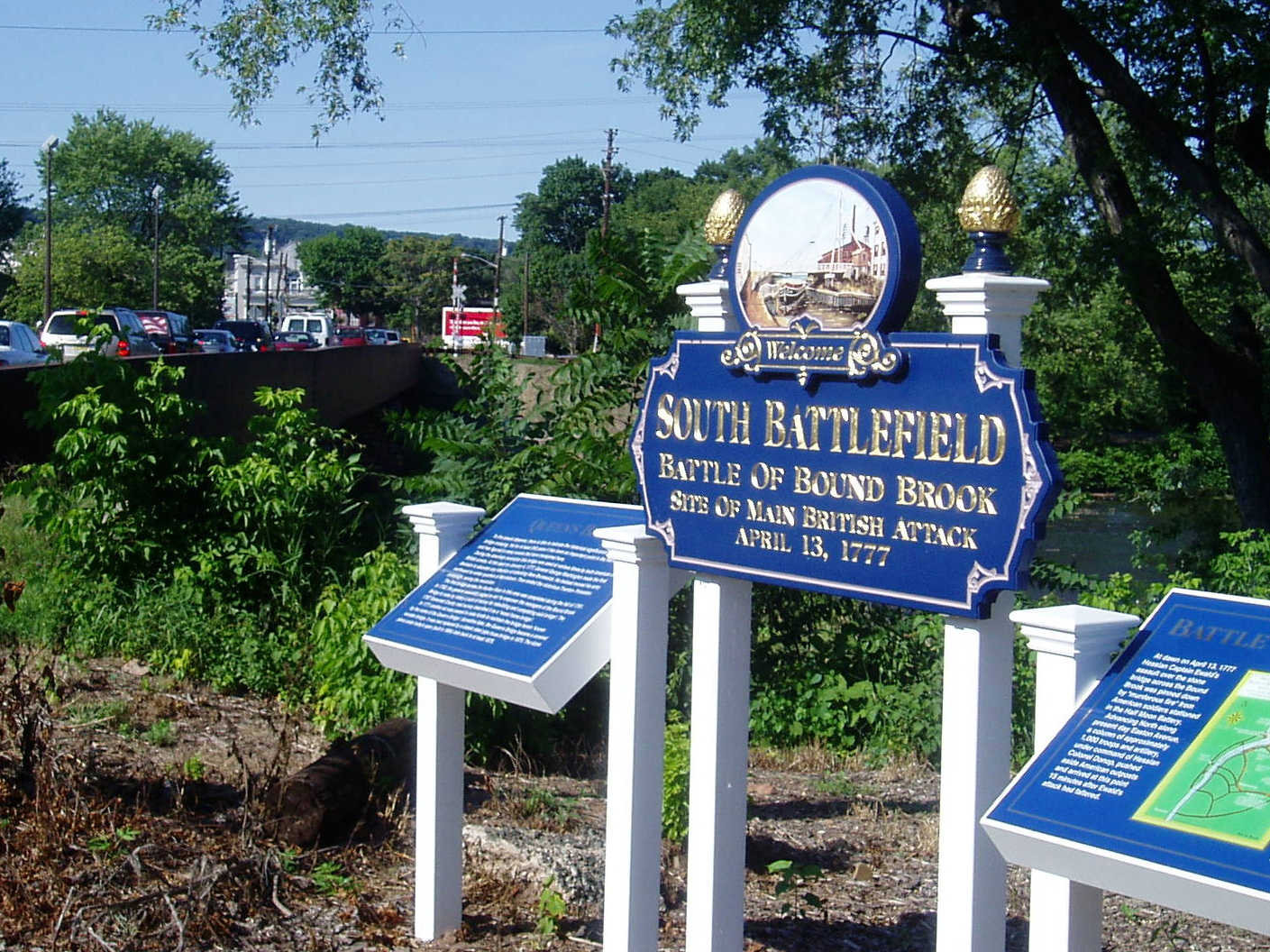
The battlefield marker in South Bound Brook

== See also ==
- Forage War – military events leading up to the Battle of Bound Brook
