= Johann Ewald =

German general (1744–1813)

Johann von Ewald
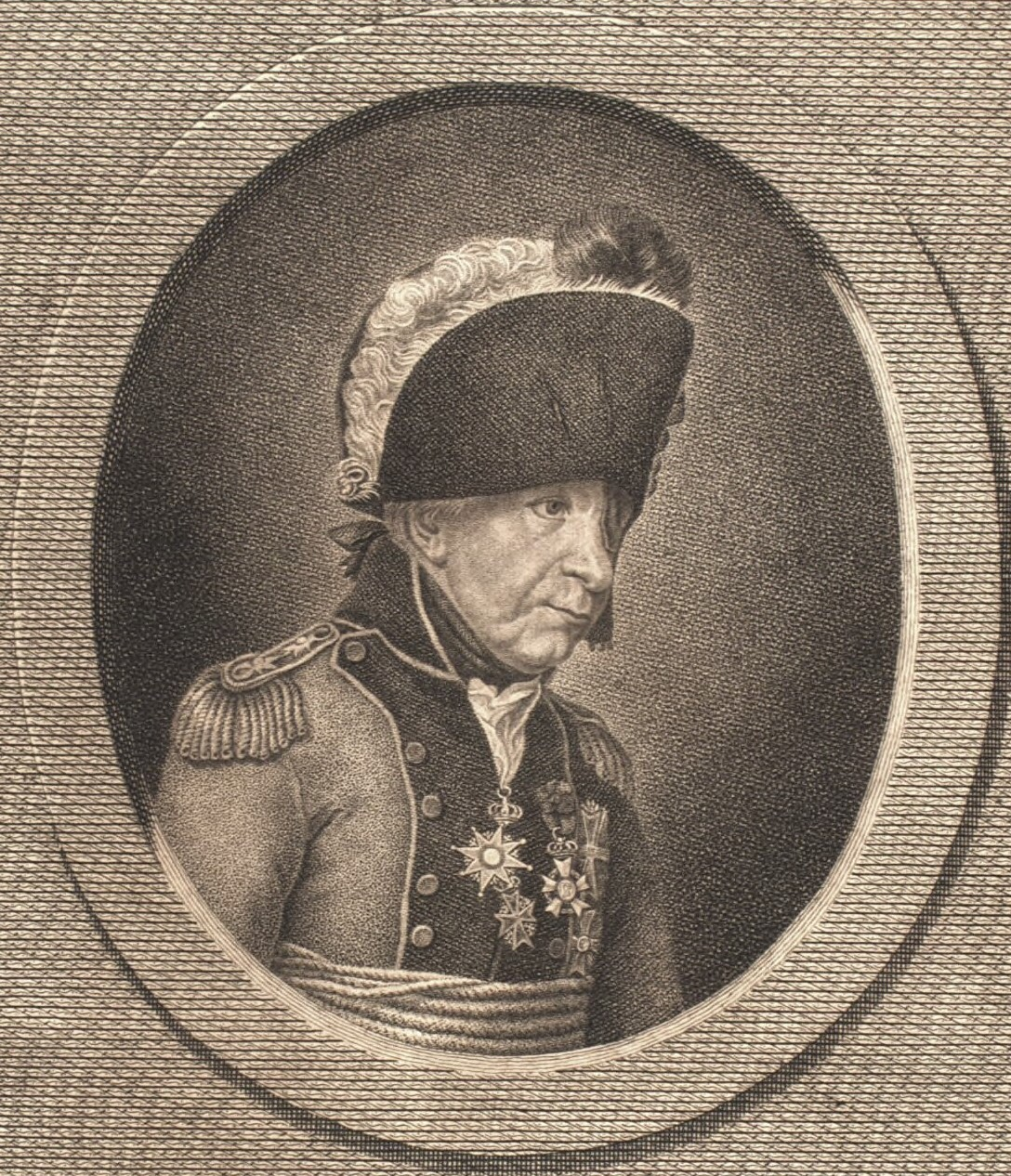
- Print of Ewald in his Danish general's uniform
- Born: 20 March 1744; Kassel, Hesse-Kassel (present-day Germany)
- Died: 25 June 1813 (aged 69)
- Military career
- Allegiance: Hesse-Kassel; Kingdom of Denmark-Norway
- Branch: Army
- Service years: Hesse-Kassel: 1762–1788; Kingdom of Denmark-Norway: 1788–1813
- Rank: Lieutenant General
- Commands: Schleswig Jäger Corps; Schleswig-Holstein Battalion of Light Infantry; Military command of Hamburg; Military command of the Duchy of Holstein
- Conflicts: Seven Years' War; Battle of Corbach; Battle of Warburg; Siege of Cassel; American Revolutionary War; Battle of White Plains; Battle of Iron Works Hill; Battle of the Assunpink Creek; Forage War; Battle of Bound Brook; Battle of Short Hills; Battle of Cooch's Bridge; Battle of Brandywine; Battle of Germantown; Battle of Red Bank; Battle of White Marsh; Battle of Barren Hill; Battle of Monmouth; Battle of Spencer's Ordinary; Siege of Yorktown; French Revolutionary Wars; Napoleonic Wars; Battle of Lübeck; Battle of Stralsund
- Awards: Grand Cross of the Order of the Dannebrog; French Legion of Honor; Dutch Order of the Union; Order of the Dannebrog

Johann von Ewald (20 March 1744 – 25 June 1813) was a German army officer from Hesse-Kassel. After first serving in the Seven Years' War, he was the commander of the Jäger corps of the Hessian Leib Infantry Regiment attached to British forces in the American Revolutionary War. He arrived with his troops, first serving in the Battle of White Plains in October 1776. He saw regular action until his capture at Yorktown in 1781.

In 1788, he joined the Danish Army, where he rose to the rank of lieutenant general; he also served as governor general of Holstein during the Napoleonic Wars. Following his American war experiences, he wrote an Essay on Partisan Warfare (German: Abhandlung über den kleinen Krieg), a widely read treatise on guerrilla warfare. He also kept a journal during most of his time in North America that has since become a valuable resource for historians of the war.

== Seven Years' War ==
Johann Ewald was born in Kassel, the capital city of the Landgraviate of Hesse-Kassel, on 30 March 1744. His father Georg Heinrich Ewald was a bookkeeper, and his mother, Katharina Elisabeth, was the daughter of a Kassel merchant. Both parents died while he was relatively young, and he was raised after their deaths by his grandmother. In an effort to dissuade the 14-year-old Ewald from a military career, he was taken to see the battlefield after the 23 July 1758 Battle of Sandershausen. Ewald's response to the scene was "Oh, how happy are they who died for their country in such a way!" In 1760 Ewald enlisted in the Regiment Gilsa, and was immediately involved in combat. Serving first in the army of Duke Ferdinand of Brunswick, the regiment saw action at Corbach and Warburg before besieging Kassel in 1761, then held by the French. Ewald was wounded during this siege in March 1761, and was promoted to ensign for his bravery. Returning to action in June, his regiment saw further action in 1761 and 1762, notably at Wilhelmstal and the second Siege of Cassel in 1762.

== Peace ==
After the Seven Years' War ended, Ewald remained with the regiment, now reduced. He was transferred to the guards, where he was promoted to second lieutenant in 1766. In 1769 he was transferred to the Leib Regiment after the Landgrave, Frederick II, decreed that only nobles could serve in the guards. On 20 February 1770, after an evening of drinking, Ewald got into an argument with a friend. In the ensuing duel, Ewald was struck in the left eye, and very nearly died. According to Ewald, the landgrave refused to punish him for this (even though it took more than a year to recover from the injury), saying "When a horse has run out of the stable, one closes the door". Ewald from then on wore a glass eye that caused him some discomfort.

Ewald enrolled in the Collegium Carolinum, where he studied military theory and economics. As a result of these studies, Ewald published his first treatise in 1774, dedicated to Frederick II: Gedanken eines hessischen Officiers über das, was man bey Führung eines Detaschements im Felde zu thun hat (Thoughts of a Hessian officer about what he has to do when leading a detachment in the field). Ewald was also promoted to captain in 1774, the last promotion he would receive in the Kassel service.

== War in America ==
=== 1776-1778: New York, New Jersey, and Philadelphia ===
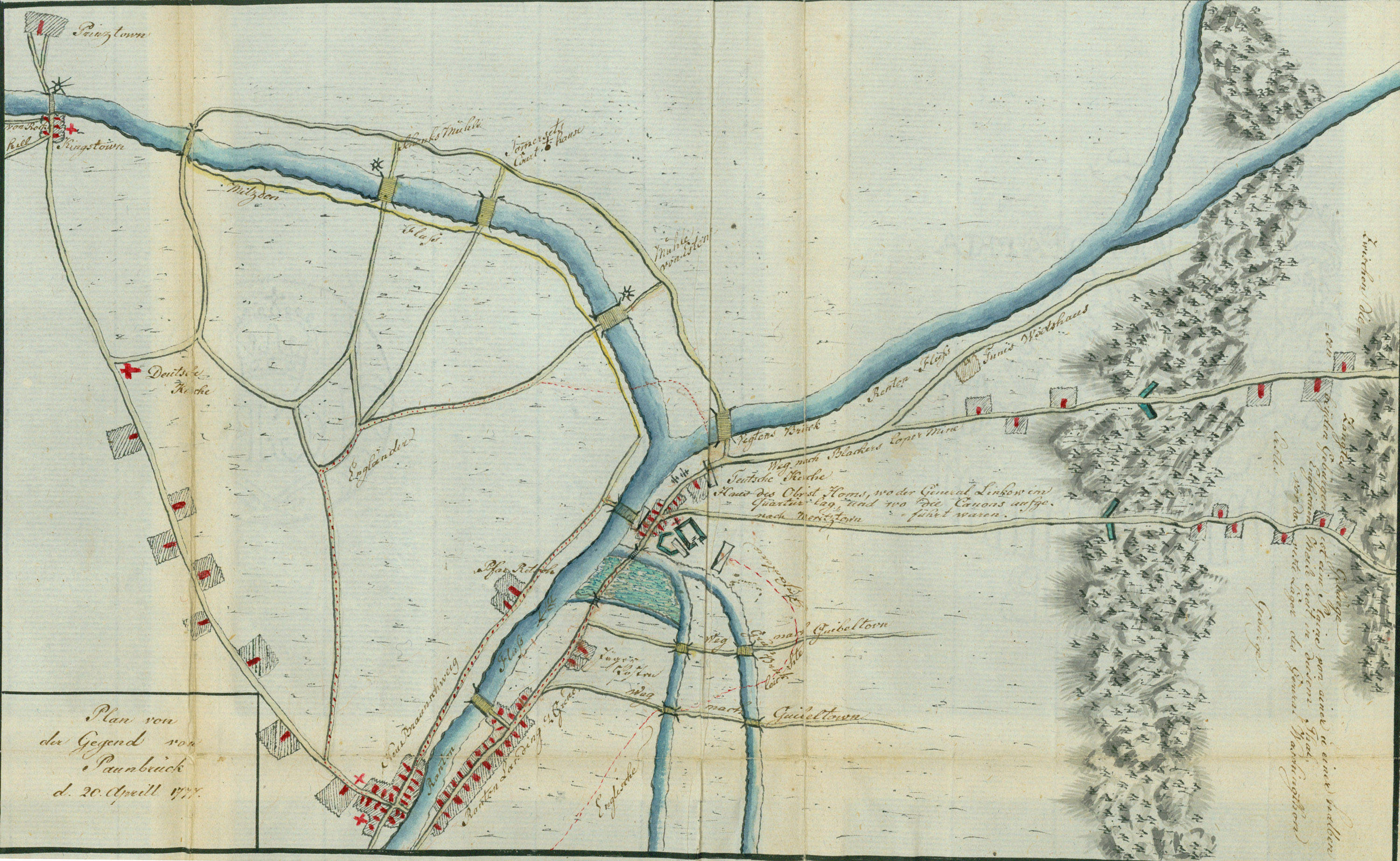
Ewald's map depicting the Battle of Bound Brook

In late 1775 Frederick II signed an agreement with King George III of Great Britain to supply him with troops for use in North America in suppressing the rebellion that had broken out in the Thirteen Colonies. The troops supplied by Frederick included the Leib Regiment, and Ewald arrived in New York City in October 1776. Sent forward to New Rochelle, his jäger company was given a lead position in the army of General William Howe, and was first engaged in the 28 October Battle of White Plains. His position in the advance became quite normal for his company, which was consequently often engaged in skirmishes and the leading edges of battles. Ewald served with some distinction in the New Jersey and Philadelphia campaigns, where he was involved in (among others) battles at Mount Holly, Brandywine, and Germantown. On the direction of General Charles Cornwallis, Ewald developed a plan of attack against a Continental Army position at Bound Brook, New Jersey in March 1777. In the April battle, the Continentals were surprised, and their commander, Benjamin Lincoln, narrowly avoided capture.

During the Philadelphia campaign, Ewald's jägers were also involved in the Battle of Red Bank. They covered the retreat after the Hessian Brigadier General Carl von Donop's disastrous attempt to take the fort by assault was repulsed, killing Donop and a number of his officers, including some that Ewald considered friends. Ewald analyzed the debacle in his journal, pointing out that the garrison should not have been summoned to surrender (removing the element of surprise), and that the main thrust of the attack was misplaced. Ewald's unit was involved in many of the minor engagements during the occupation of Philadelphia, and was almost constantly engaging the Americans during the British march across New Jersey. Ewald noted of that march, "One can truly state that this march cost two thousand men."

=== 1779-1781: New York, Charleston, and Virginia ===
In 1779 Ewald's company was involved in British operations to capture key American defenses at Stony Point, New York. It was not involved in the American response, a raid by Brigadier General Anthony Wayne that captured more than half the British garrison. Most of 1779 was spent on guard duty, until December, when his unit, specifically requested by Generals Clinton and Cornwallis, was selected for the expedition to take Charleston, South Carolina. His company was again in the vanguard on the march from the landing place to the city. At one point he used a ruse to reconnoiter an enemy position on the Stono River. After waving his handkerchief, he approached an enemy outpost, and inquired whether the unit, which he ascertained to be Pulaski's Legion, had a supposed acquaintance of his serving in it. During the conversation he carefully noted the surrounding features, before returning to his unit. This action drew praise from General Clinton. After the successful siege, Ewald's company returned to New York with General Clinton, leaving Cornwallis the task of taking control of South Carolina. He spent the remainder of 1780 on guard duty around New York, until he learned in December that his company had been chosen to be part of Benedict Arnold's expedition to Virginia.

Landing in Virginia on 31 December 1780, the expedition moved up the James River, Ewald's company and the Queen's Rangers of John Graves Simcoe in the lead, and raided Richmond on 5 January 1781. The force then made its way to Portsmouth, destroying military and economic targets along the way. Ewald's company reached Portsmouth on 19 January, and began the task of fortifying the town. The arrival of a small French fleet in the area was accompanied by a flurry of defensive activity, but the French left without taking any action. Rumors of French and American forces (both land and naval) to attack the position led Arnold to order additional work to fortify the Portsmouth area against possible attacks. When French ships were again sighted (probably consequent to the 16 March Battle of Cape Henry), tensions rose again in the town, and Ewald was wounded in the knee during a patrol on 19 March. At the time, a small detachment of Ewald's jägers was apparently the only force providing defense against a large detachment of American militia on the far side of a creek. Arnold's failure to mention the jägers' valor in holding off this force rankled Ewald, and he complained of it to the commander. Arnold ensured that recognition of their work was given that evening. The French flag sighted turned out to have been a false flag; the ships had in fact been British, and were followed on 31 March by the arrival of more than 2,000 men under the command of William Phillips. While Ewald recuperated from his injury at Norfolk, Phillips led the combined forces on further raids into Virginia. His forces were eventually taken over by General Cornwallis, who joined his southern army with then at Petersburg in May.

On 29 May, General Alexander Leslie arrived in Portsmouth to take command of the establishment. Feeling recovered from his injury, Ewald requested and received permission to rejoin his unit with Cornwallis's army. He was with that force through its movements in Virginia. During the later stages of these movements, Ewald's unit was often detached along with Simcoe's on foraging and raiding expeditions. On the morning of 26 June, Simcoe's force was resting before rejoining Cornwallis in Williamsburg, when it was surprised by an advance company of Americans. These were from a larger detachment of the Marquis de Lafayette's army led by General Wayne that was chasing after Simcoe, hoping to bring him to an engagement. The resulting battle was somewhat confused, and both sides broke off the battle, fearing the supporting force of the other was near. Ewald, as soon as the alarm was raised, coolly organized his jägers in a position to attack the American flank. The British eventually withdrew, only to meet Cornwallis and his advance units a few miles down the road.

Although Ewald was not involved in the Battle of Green Spring that attended the British army's crossing of the James River on 6 July, he was with the army when it arrived at Yorktown. As the American and French forces began to concentrate around them, Ewald and his jägers continued to be on the edges, making forage raids and skirmishing with the enemy; however, sickness took its toll on his unit. He reported on 18 September that his unit had shrunk to 29 men, half of whom were sick. As the siege neared its end, Cornwallis released all of the former slaves that had accompanied his army, intending to force them to become a burden on the Americans. However, Ewald recounts making a patrol into the no mans land between the two forces, and having to force groups of those unfortunates to move further toward the American lines. Following the British surrender, Ewald returned to New York on parole. His depression over the circumstances was lifted by a letter from Frederick II, specifically citing Ewald for "fine conduct" and rewarded him with "my extraordinary satisfaction and the assurance of my entirely special favore and grace."

Ewald spent 1782 and 1783 with the rest of the jäger corps on Long Island. Sickness acquired in the south recurred, and he was eventually released from his parole as part of a prisoner exchange. However, the war was effectively at an end, with peace concluded in September 1783. In October of that year, Ewald left New York with a friend to visit West Point, due to its reputation as the most important American stronghold of the war. General Henry Knox graciously allowed them access, and had his adjutant show them around. On 21 November, the jäger corps was among the last units to leave New York. On 22 April 1784, Ewald returned to Kassel.

== Service with Denmark ==
On his return, Ewald was reassigned to the Regiment von Dittfurth. Over the next year, he worked on another military treatise, Abhandlung über den kleinen Krieg (Essay on partisan warfare), that was published in 1785. Upon the death of Frederick II, William IX ordered Ewald to reform the Hesse-Hanau jäger force. In 1787 Ewald, still a captain, was passed over for promotion. The officers promoted ahead of him were nobles, and the indignity led him to request a release from service so that he might pursue opportunities for advancement elsewhere. William's brother Charles recommended Ewald for service in Denmark, where he had been raised. In August 1788, Ewald departed for Denmark with his new bride, Susanne. Ewald was hopeful for action, as there were rumors that Denmark would be drawn into the war just begun between Russia and Sweden.

Ewald was commissioned a lieutenant colonel in the Danish army, and authorized to raise a corps of jägers in the Duchy of Schleswig, then a Danish territory. He was given command of a light infantry battalion in 1790, and also raised to the Danish nobility. In 1795 he was promoted to colonel, with a promotion to major general following in 1802. In 1801 he commanded the Danish occupying forces in Hamburg and Lübeck, where he was so well liked by the citizenry that they invited him to become their civil governor; he declined.

By 1803, the Napoleonic Wars began to threaten Denmark, which had remained neutral. Ewald was again in the vanguard of the military forces, responsible for the defense of the Duchy of Holstein, which represented Denmark's southern frontier. In 1806, after the Prussian loss to French forces in the Battle of Lübeck, Prussian forces attempted to cross the border to escape the French. The French, believing they had done so, demanded the right to cross the border in pursuit. Ewald, in a bold bid to speak directly with the French commander, Joachim Murat, jumped a horse over a ditch and convinced a French officer to bring him to Murat. Murat refused to believe Ewald's assertion that Prussians had not crossed the border, and threatened to kill him. Murat also refused to give Ewald an escort back to his own lines; Ewald had some difficult returning due to the unsettled conditions in the area. The incident resulted in the removal of French forces from Danish territory. Napoleon also insured that Danish neutrality was respected.

Danish neutrality did not last much longer. In 1807 the British launched a preemptive strike against Copenhagen, driving Crown Prince Frederick into alliance with the French. Danish plans to attack Sweden during the winter of 1808-1809 were not realized due to bad weather; Ewald was to have been in the vanguard. Frederick, who ascended to the throne in 1809, awarded Ewald with the Grand Cross of the Order of Dannebrog. In May 1809 Ewald and a Danish corps were sent to assist in putting down a revolt in Swedish Pomerania. Combined with Dutch forces, the revolt was put down in the decisive Battle of Stralsund; the rebel leader, Ferdinand von Schill, was killed by a Danish soldier. Ewald's performance in the battle was lauded: Frederick promoted him to lieutenant general, and he was awarded the Dutch Order of the Union and the French Legion of Honor.

Ewald continued to serve in command of Danish forces stationed in Schleswig-Holstein, but saw no further action. In 1812 King Frederick awarded him the Order of Dannebrog. Ewald retired in May 1813, suffering from dropsy. He died in Kiel on 25 June, surrounded by his wife, son, and five daughters. He was buried four days later. The cemetery in Kiel where he was interred was destroyed by Allied bombing during World War II.

== Legacy ==
Ewald's son Carl also served in the Danish military, rising to the rank of major general.

In addition to numerous treatises on military tactics, Ewald kept a journal during his service in North America. The diary was a four volume bound edition prepared by Ewald for his heirs in 1798. Joseph Tustin acquired three of the four volumes in the aftermath of World War II, and spent many years searching for the missing third volume. Although he believes it to have been destroyed, he did acquire a copy of the third volume's text, made from a copy of the original in the possession of the heirs of the Schleswig-Holstein nobility. Tustin describes the diary as "the most important and comprehensive diary kept by a Hessian mercenary."

His great-great-grandson was Danish designer Poul Henningsen.
