= William Holt (mayor) =

American politician (1730–1791)

William Holt (1730–1791) was a Colonial American mayor of Williamsburg, Virginia from 1776 to 1777 and again from 1782 to 1783.

Holt was born in Virginia the son of David and Margaret Holt. His brother John Holt also was mayor of Williamsburg. He married Mary Steward. He started a Presbyterian settlement in New Kent County, with the Reverend John Jeffrey Smith and owned several mills and a forge in a five hundred acre (2 km^{2}) tract of land.

On November 16, 1761, Holt became a member of the Commission of the Peace for York Co., Virginia. He served on the commission until 1771, when he became a justice for James City Co., Virginia.

His children were Elizabeth (1762), William (1765), Daniel, Henry, Samuel, Jane, Mary and John Holt.

Holt was made the quarter master of Williamsburg's militia in 1762. In 1776, Holt began his year-long term as the mayor of Williamsburg and on December 17, 1776, he was appointed to the Admiralty Court by the Virginia legislature.

His daughter Elizabeth is said to have married William Coleman who would also become a mayor of Williamsburg.

Political offices
Preceded by William Pasteur	Mayor of Williamsburg, Virginia; 1776–1777	Succeeded by Samuel Griffin
Preceded by Samuel Griffin	Mayor of Williamsburg, Virginia; 1782–1783	Succeeded by William Finnie
