= Battle of Spencer's Ordinary =

Battle of the American Revolutionary War

Coordinates: 37.319479°N 76.798139°W

- Part of the American Revolutionary War
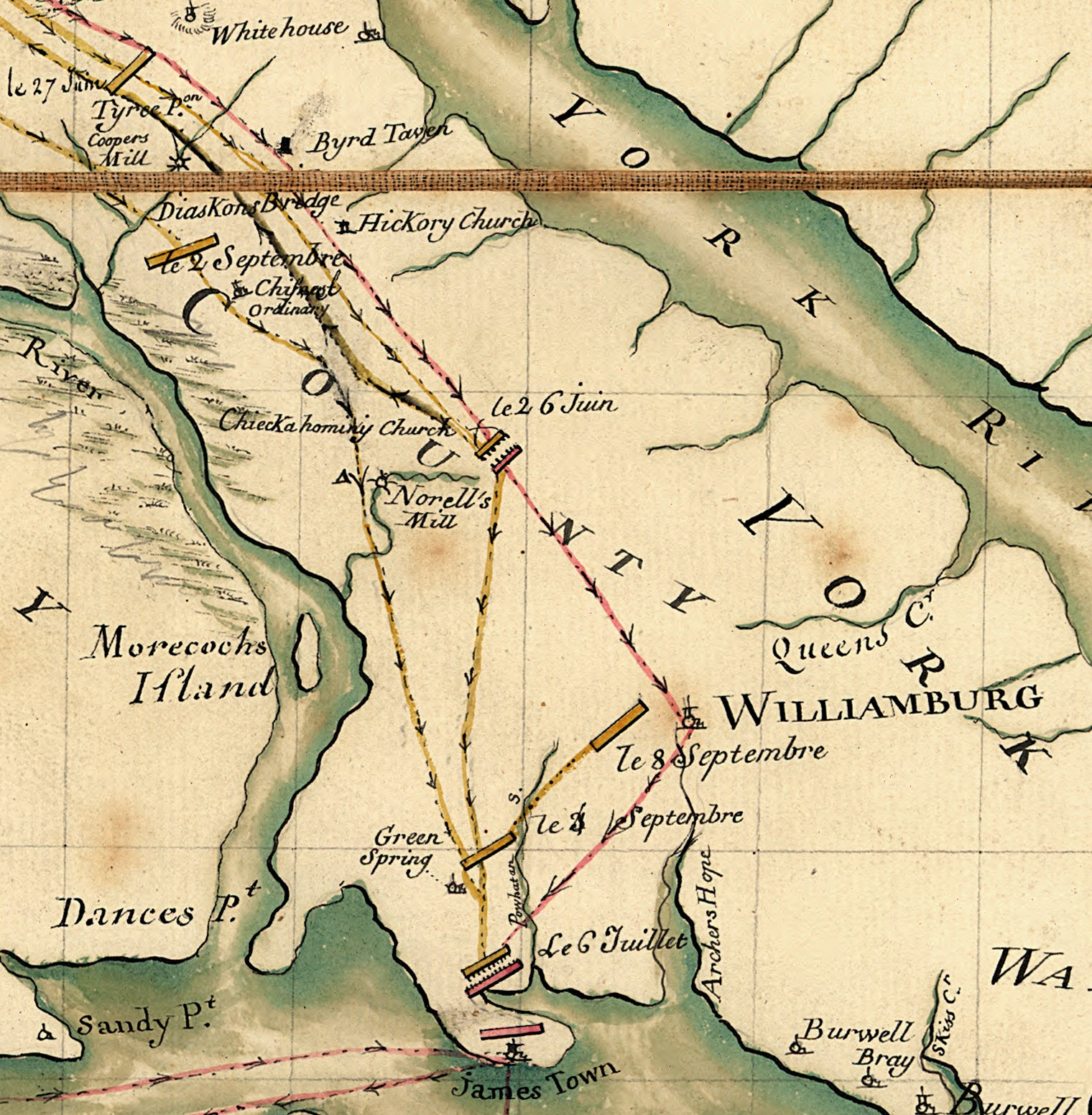
- Detail from a 1781 French map prepared for Lafayette depicting his and Cornwallis's movements. The clash at Spencer's is marked by "le 26 Juin".
Date	26 June 1781
Location	James City County, near Williamsburg, Virginia
Result	Inconclusive

Belligerents
United States	Great Britain: Hesse-Kassel

Commanders and leaders
Richard Butler	John Graves Simcoe

Strength
570	400

Casualties and losses
9 killed 14 wounded 32 captured	11 killed 25 wounded

The Battle of Spencer's Ordinary was an inconclusive skirmish that took place on 26 June 1781, late in the American Revolutionary War. British forces under Lieutenant Colonel John Graves Simcoe and American forces under Colonel Richard Butler, light detachments from the armies of General Lord Cornwallis and the Marquis de Lafayette respectively, clashed near a tavern (the "ordinary") at a road intersection not far from Williamsburg, Virginia.

Lafayette had been shadowing Cornwallis as he moved his army toward Williamsburg from central Virginia. Aware that Simcoe had become separated from Cornwallis, he sent Butler out in an attempt to cut Simcoe off. Both sides, concerned that the other might be reinforced by its main army, eventually broke off the battle.

== Background ==
In May 1781, Lord Charles Cornwallis arrived in Petersburg, Virginia after a lengthy campaign through North and South Carolina. In addition to his 1,400 troops, he assumed command of another 3,600 troops that had been under the command of the turncoat Benedict Arnold, and was soon thereafter further reinforced by about 2,000 more troops sent from New York. These forces were opposed by a much smaller Continental Army force led by the Marquis de Lafayette, then located at Richmond. Following orders originally given to Arnold's predecessor in command, William Phillips (who died a week before Cornwallis' arrival), Cornwallis worked to eliminate Virginia's ability to support the revolutionary cause, and gave chase to Lafayette's army, which numbered barely 3,000 and included a large number of inexperienced militia.

Lafayette successfully eluded engaging Cornwallis for about one month, who used his numerical advantage to detach forces for raids against economic, military, and political targets in central Virginia. Cornwallis then turned back to the east, marching for Williamsburg. Lafayette, whose force grew to number about 4,000 with the arrival of Continental Army reinforcements under General Anthony Wayne and additional experienced militiamen under William Campbell, followed Cornwallis. Buoyed by the increase in his troop strength, Lafayette also became more aggressive in his tactics, sending out detachments of his force to counteract those that Cornwallis sent on forage and raiding expeditions. These detachments were composed of select units taken from a variety of regiments. Among those that were commonly in the army's advance guard were a combined cavalry and infantry unit from Pennsylvania under Captain William McPherson, and companies of Virginia riflemen under Majors Richard Call and John Willis.

John Graves Simcoe, the British commander at the battle

Lafayette, once he was joined by Wayne and Campbell, wanted to engage elements of Cornwallis' army without necessarily facing its full strength. As Cornwallis approached Williamsburg, Lafayette and Wayne received word that a British-led force under Lieutenant-colonel John Graves Simcoe was returning from a expedition to destroy boats and forage for supplies on the Chickahominy River. Simcoe's force comprised the Loyalist Queen's Rangers regiment along with several companies of Hessian jägers under Captains Johann Ewald and Johann Althaus. On the night of 25 June, Wayne sent most of the advance guard under Colonel Richard Butler, including McPherson, Call, and Willis, to intercept Simcoe's force. A forward party of about 50 dragoons and 50 light infantry under McPherson caught up with advance companies of Simcoe's force near Spencer's Ordinary, a tavern at a road intersection about 6 miles (9.7 km) north of Williamsburg.

== Battle ==
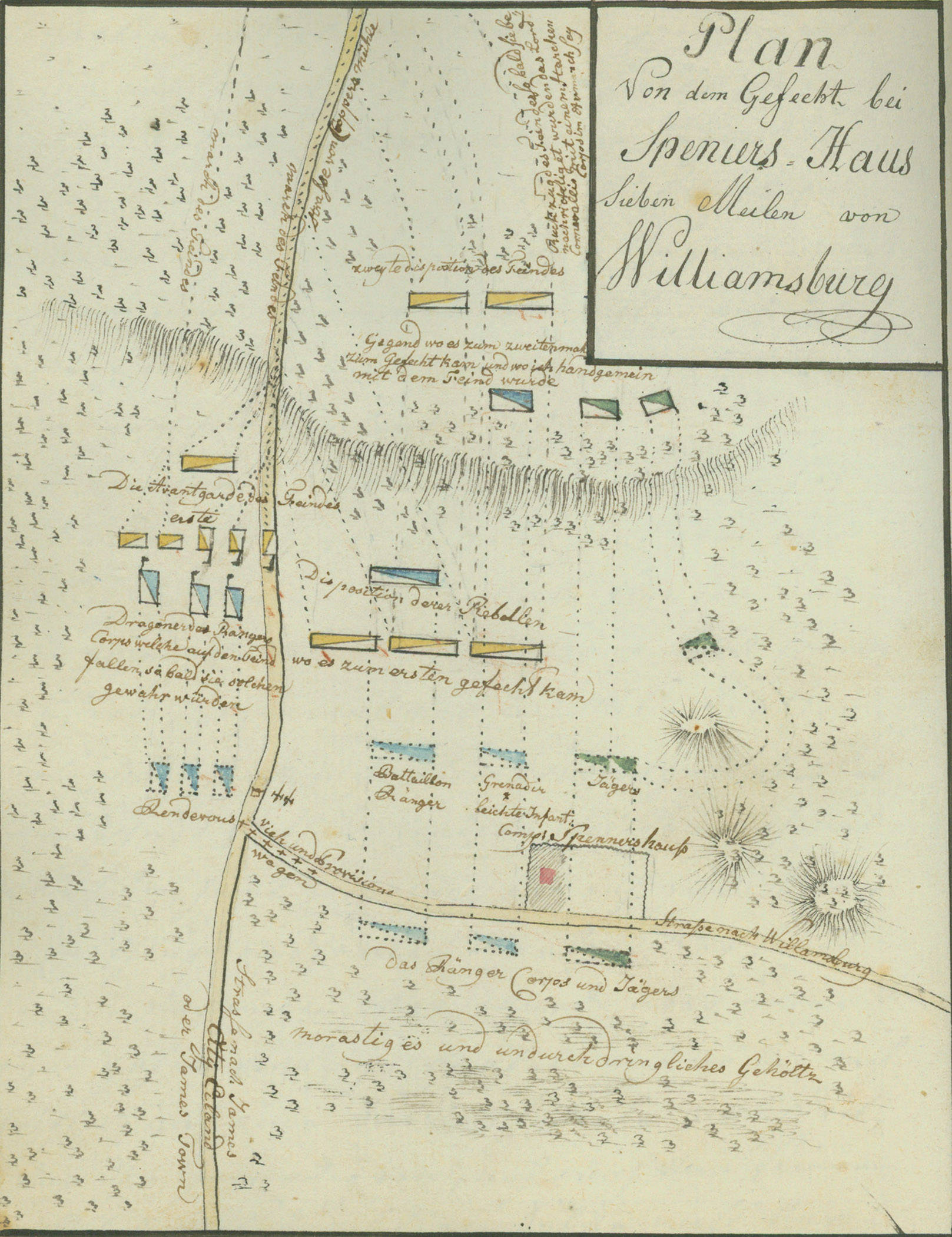
Map by Johann Ewald depicting the action. American forces are yellow, British blue.

Simcoe's troops were moving down the road toward Williamsburg, convoying some cattle with the infantry and jägers in the lead under Major Richard Armstrong, with Simcoe and the cavalry about an hour behind them. At Spencer's Ordinary ("ordinary" meaning tavern at the time), the troops rejoined and paused to rest. Simcoe ordered fences in the area torn down since "it was an admirable place for the chicanery of action". While they rested, some of the Loyalists went out to round up more cattle found in the area, and the cavalry went to a nearby farm to feed their horses. McPherson's men encountered the latter, whose sentries raised the alarm to the main body. Simcoe's cavalry charged McPherson's formation, breaking it up. McPherson and a number of his men were unhorsed in the melee, and several were taken prisoner before the leading edge of Butler's main force began to arrive. Simcoe ordered most of the infantry up to support his cavalry, and sent the jägers and light infantry into the woods on the right to flank the arriving enemy column.

By questioning the prisoners, Simcoe learned that Lafayette was not far off. He sent word to Cornwallis, dispatched the cattle convoy toward Williamsburg, and ordered trees to be felled to make a barricade across the road as a point of defense. He then arrayed his troops in a way calculated to mislead the Americans into believing that more troops were in formation just over a rise. When Butler's force arrived, Simcoe ordered an infantry charge. This scattered the first wave of Butler's men into the nearby woods, where the jägers then pushed them back. However, Butler's men continued to advance. Simcoe ordered a cavalry charge and fired a field cannon to give the impression that a larger force was arriving. The charge forced Butler's men back, at which point the two forces disengaged, Simcoe because he was concerned that Lafayette was approaching, and Butler because his men were fooled by Simcoe's stratagem.

== Aftermath ==
Simcoe left his wounded men at the tavern under a truce flag, and withdrew down the Williamsburg road, joining with forces Cornwallis sent about two miles (3.2 km) down the road. The Americans retreated to Lafayette's camp at Tyre's Plantation, and Simcoe was able to return to the tavern and recover his wounded.

Simcoe reported his losses at 11 killed and 25 wounded, and the American loss at 9 killed, 14 wounded, and 32 captured. Lafayette claimed the Americans had killed 60 and wounded 100, while Cornwallis claimed the British had 33 killed and wounded. (The latter number agrees with that provided by Fryer and Dracott if Hessian casualties are excluded.)

The location of the battle is now within the grounds of James City County's Freedom Park in Williamsburg. Published park materials do not indicate if the exact location is marked in any way.

== Butler's identity ==
Sources disagree on the name of the Butler who commanded the American force. In early histories, Benson Lossing claims that one Percival Butler was in command, who had also served under Daniel Morgan in earlier campaigns, while Henry Johnston identifies the commander as Richard Butler, a hero of Stony Point. In modern histories, Fryer and Dracott also identify him as Richard, while Brendan Morrissey apparently misidentifies him as John Butler.
