= Tugendbund =

Secret society

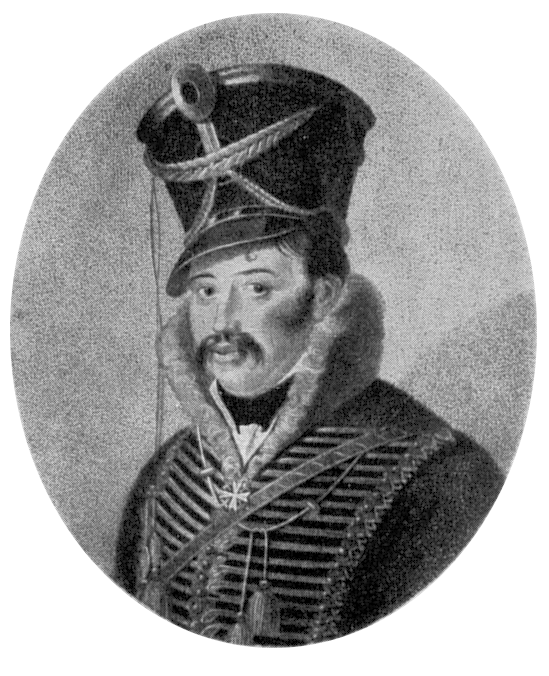
Ferdinand von Schill

Tugendbund, or League of Virtue was a quasi-Masonic secret society founded in June 1808, in order to revive the national spirit of Prussians after their defeat by Napoleon. It was established after the Battle of Jena–Auerstedt, in the spring of 1808 at Koningsberg.

== History ==
The three masonic lodges of Koningsberg who established Tugendbund, officially named it "Scientific society for the exercise of morality" (Sittlich Wissenschaftlicher-Verein). Despite the fact that the specific society was approved by Frederick William III on June 30, 1808, it met the hostility of Heinrich Friedrich Karl vom und zum Stein who sought to promote his own view on the Prussian reforms. The society was initially banned by Napoleonic decree and then by Frederick William III in December 1809.

== Objectives and rebellions ==
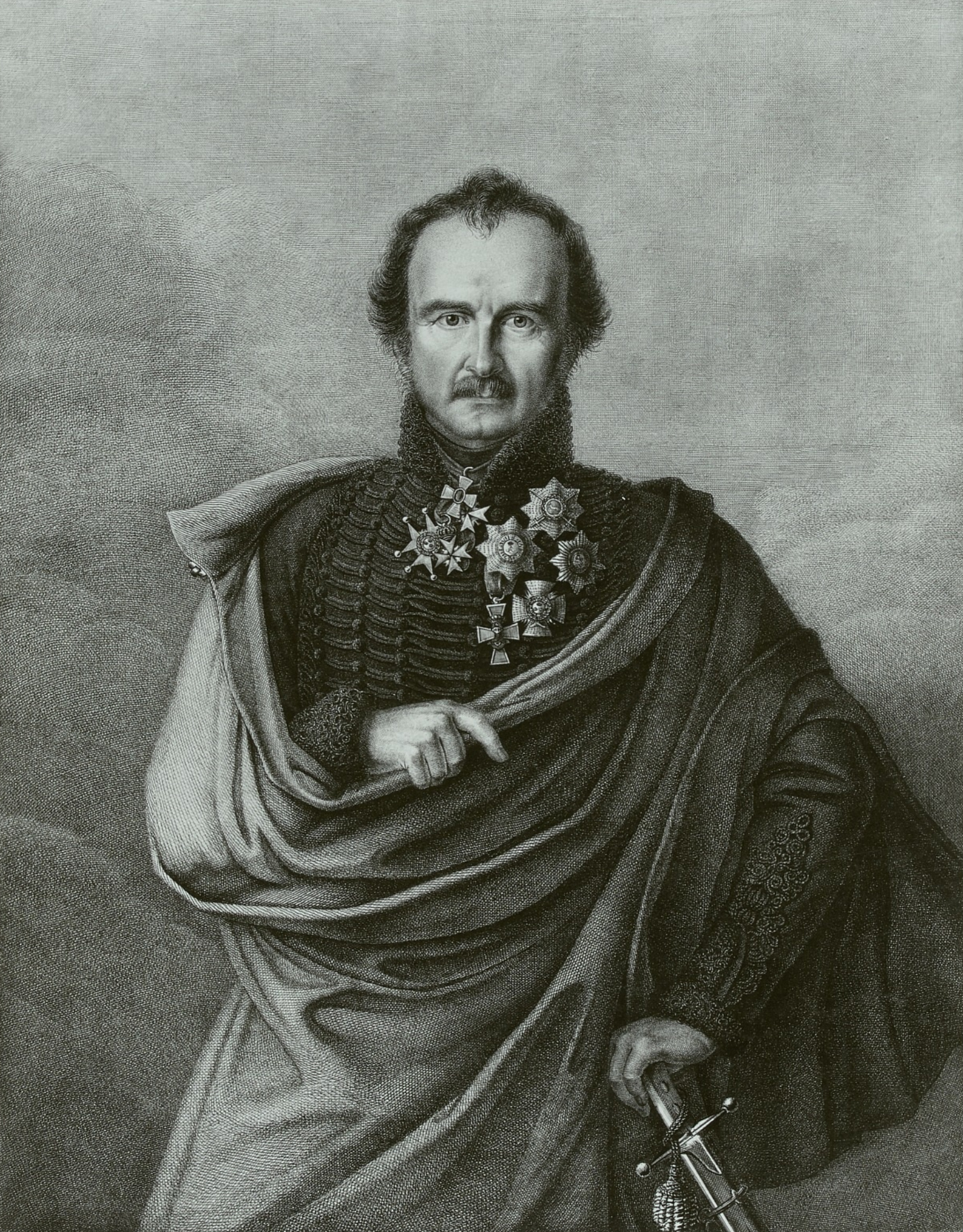
Wilhelm von Dörnberg by Ludwig Emil Grimm (1790–1863)

The objectives of Tugendbund were apparently pedagogical. However, some members, encouraged by the successes of the Spanish revolt, were persuaded that they needed more direct military action against France. In April 1809 Friedrich von Katte, former Prussian officer led a revolt in Westphalia aiming to seize Magdeburg. However, he failed to rouse the local population and decamping and scattering his military body of volunteers returned to Berlin, where he was arrested.

Soon another member of Tugendbund, Wilhelm von Dörnberg, former military, led another uprising, aiming to occupy Kassel, the capital of Westphalia. Dörnberg was eventually defeated by the troops of Westphalia and fled to England.

Most famous of all riots was the revolt of Ferdinand von Schill. Schill participated in Tugendbund after the war and was in contact with Katte and Dörnberg. In April 1809 Schill led his regiment of Hussars in Saxony, just before the border with Westphalia. The revolt allegedly caused the enthusiasm of local people, without, however, any kind of military support. Schill was killed in Stralsund, in May 1809. By June of the same year leaflets naming him a hero and good patriot circulated in Berlin.

Under Napoleon's pressure, who tried to suppress anti-French feelings, Frederick William III ordered the suppression of such publications and leaflets. The Tugendbund has been terminated in late 1809, while the surviving officers were convicted and were dismissed for their role in the uprising.

== Membership ==
Members of Tugendbund were mostly liberal nobles, representatives of the intelligentsia and officials. Society was established on a network of groups dedicated to cultivating patriotic feelings, with ultimate goal the liberation of German territory from French occupation. This was the reason that promoted practical reforms and moral improvement through education. Although it was open to all professions and religions, it never became a mass organization.

By August 1809 Tugendbund had 748 members, mostly senior bureaucrats, academics and clergy. Traders, students and artisans were represented, too, although in a smaller proportion. The overall society's network was made up from groups of East Prussia, Pomerania, Brandenburg and Silesia. The society was officially terminated in January 1810.

== See also ==
- Secret society

== Bibliography ==
- Gates, David (1997). Napoleonic Wars, 1803–1815. New York: Edward Arnold Publishers. ISBN 978-0-340-61447-1.
- Ibbeken, Rudolf (1970), Preußen 1807–1813. Saat und Volk als Idee und in Wirklichkeit, Cologne: Grote.
- Leighton, James (2013). Witnessing the Revolutionary and Napoleonic Wars in German Central Europe. NY: Palgrave Macmillan. ISBN 978-0230249172.
- Mustafa, Sam A. (2008). The Long Ride of Major von Schill: A Journey through German History and Memory (KINDLE BOOK). Lanham: Rowman & Littlefield Publishers.
