= Samuel Griffin =

American politician

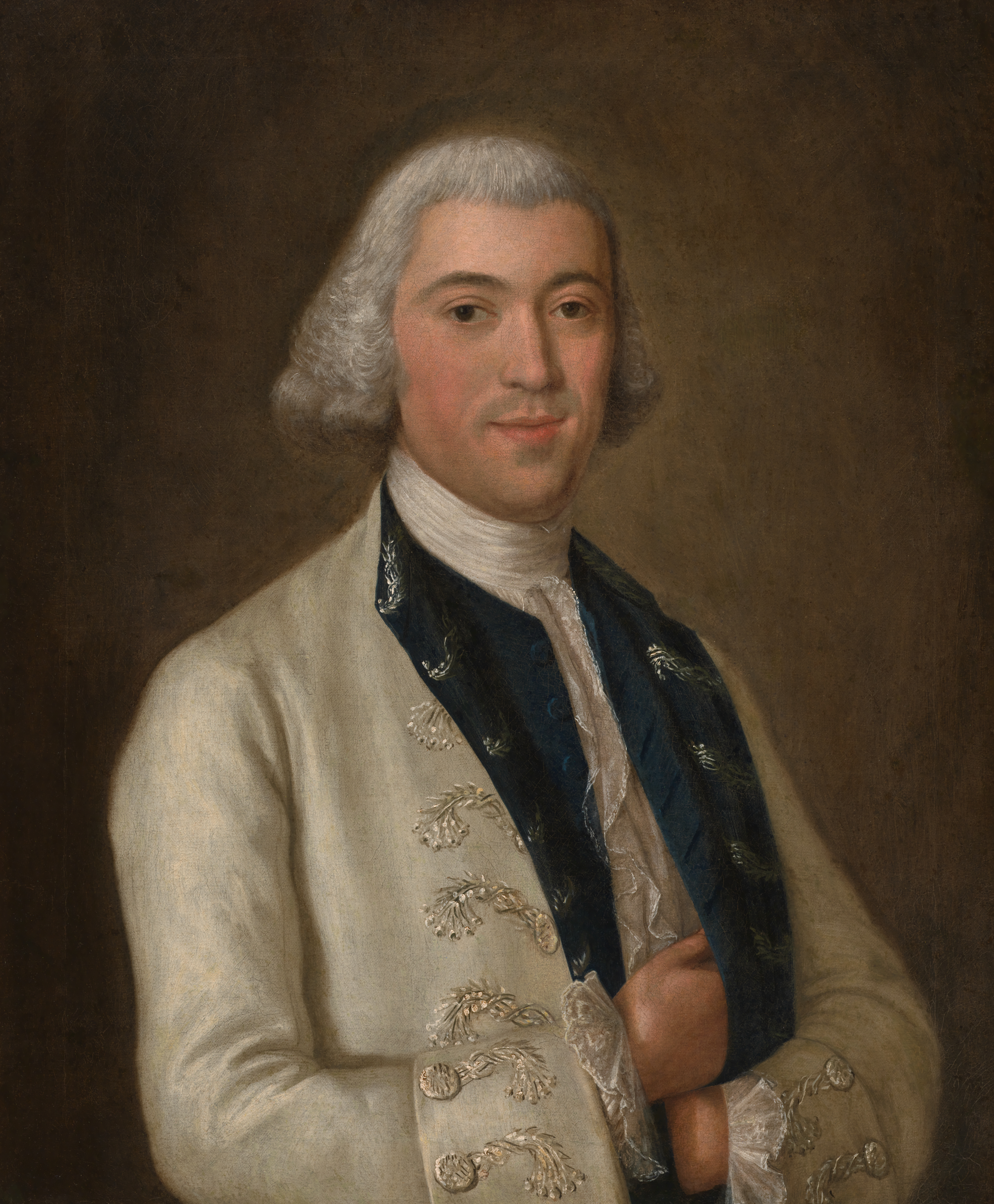
- Portrait by Cosmo Alexander, c. 1770

Member of the U.S. House of Representatives from Virginia's 13th district
- In office March 4, 1793 – March 3, 1795
- Preceded by: None (district created)
- Succeeded by: John Clopton

Member of the U.S. House of Representatives from Virginia's 10th district
- In office March 4, 1789 – March 3, 1793
- Preceded by: None (district created)
- Succeeded by: Carter B. Harrison

Member of the Virginia House of Delegates from Williamsburg
- In office December 16, 1786 – November 14, 1788
- Preceded by: James Innes
- Succeeded by: Edmund Randolph

Personal details
- Born: April 20, 1746 Richmond County, Colony of Virginia, British America
- Died: November 23, 1810 (aged 64) Williamsburg, Virginia, U.S.
- Spouse: Elizabeth Braxton

Military service
- Allegiance: United States
- Branch/service: Continental Army
- Rank: Colonel
- Battles/wars: American Revolutionary War; Battle of Harlem Heights; Battle of Iron Works Hill

Samuel Griffin (April 20, 1746 – November 23, 1810) was an American lawyer, soldier, politician, and slave trader from Virginia. Following his service during the American Revolutionary War as a Continental Army officer, Griffin served as mayor of Williamsburg, Virginia, as well as represented the former state capitol in the Virginia House of Delegates, then (with surrounding areas) in the U.S. House of Representatives.

== Early and family life ==
Born in Richmond County in the Colony of Virginia to Leroy Griffin and his wife, the former Mary Ann Bertrand. His slightly younger brother Cyrus Griffin would likewise become a Virginia lawyer and patriot, serving as a Continental Congressman representing Virginia's Northern Neck region (where they were raised) and later as federal judge, for what was then the U.S. District Court for the District of Virginia. Another brother Corbin Griffin (d.1813) received a medical degree from the University of Edinburgh before setting up a practice in Yorktown and became chief surgeon during the Revolutionary War before his imprisonment by the British, and later served as a Virginia state senator. Earlier, the Griffin boys received a private education appropriate to their class, including classical studies and law.

Samuel Griffin married Elizabeth Braxton, daughter of prominent Virginia planter and patriot Carter Braxton, likewise of the First Families of Virginia. They had only one child, Elizabeth Corbin Griffin Stewart (1779-1853), who survived two husbands (including a Williamsburg physician) and ultimately died in Philadelphia.

== Continental Army officer ==
During the Revolutionary War Griffin accepted a commission as a colonel in the Continental Army. An aide-de-camp to English-born General Charles Lee, he was wounded at the Battle of Harlem Heights on September 16, 1776.

Colonel Griffin recuperated from his wounds near Philadelphia. When the American army retreated behind the Delaware River in December 1776, the commanding general of the Philadelphia Department, Israel Putnam, followed General Washington's instruction and ordered Col. Griffin to "create a distraction" for the British forces then present near Trenton, New Jersey. Thus, Griffin led about 900 militia and Virginia regulars into Mount Holly, from which he harassed the pickets of Colonel Carl von Donop at Bordentown. Colonel Von Donop brought all of his 2,000 or so troops to Mount Holly to punish Griffin in the Battle of Iron Works Hill. However, the action put Von Donop's troops out of position to assist Colonel Rall in Trenton. Thus, on the morning of December 26, 1776, Washington crossed the Delaware and defeated Rall at Trenton. Local lore says a "certain young widow of a doctor" assisted Griffin by detaining von Donop in Mount Holly.

== Lawyer and politician ==
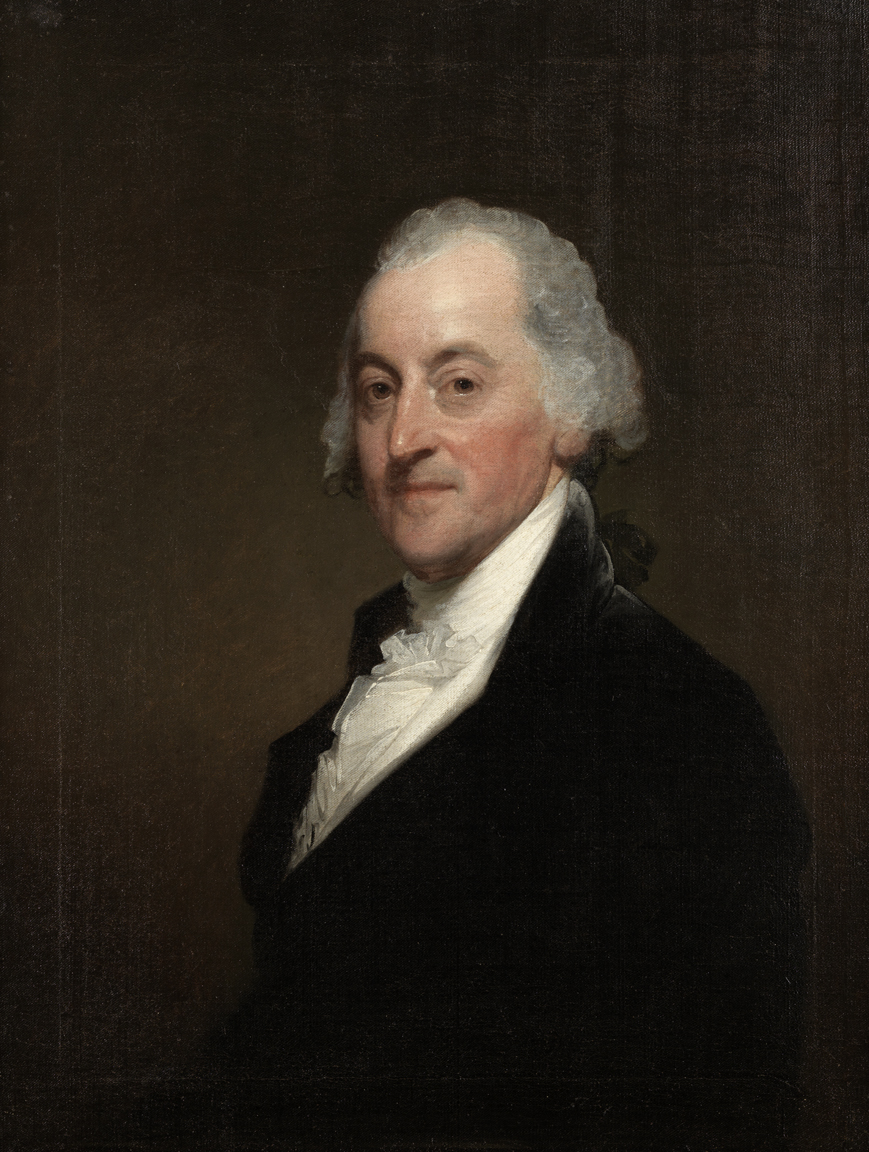
Portrait by Gilbert Stuart, c. 1800

Admitted to the Virginia bar, Griffin practiced law. Following the New Jersey battles, Griffin returned to Virginia and as a citizen soldier served on the State's board of war (1779-1781). During this period, Williamsburg remained strategically important as the colonial capitol and was threatened by British warships offshore in Hampton Roads. Griffin served as Williamsburg's mayor from 1779 to 1780. After the war ended and fellow former soldier and Williamsburg lawyer James Innes became Attorney General of Virginia, Williamsburg voters elected Griffin to replace him in the Virginia House of Delegates and re-elected him twice to the part time position. Thus, he served from 1786 through 1788, when he resigned upon being elected to the U.S. House of Representatives and Edmund Randolph resigned as Virginia's governor (at the time elected by the Virginia General Assembly and having little power) in order to succeed Griffin as Williamsburg's delegate.

Voters from Williamsburg and surrounding areas elected Griffin to the First, Second, and Third Congresses. Thus, he served from March 4, 1789 until March 3, 1795, although the district number changed from Virginia's 10th congressional district to Virginia's 13th congressional district in 1793.

== Death and legacy ==
Griffin died in New York City on November 23, 1810. He is buried in the churchyard of Trinity Church on Wall Street, his headstone does not survive and he was previously incorrectly recorded under his brother's name.

== See also ==
Retrieved on 2010-01-05

- Fischer, David Hackett (2004). Washington's Crossing. New York: Oxford University Press. ISBN 0-19-518159-X.

Political offices
Preceded by incomplete record	Mayor of Williamsburg, Virginia; 1779–1780	Succeeded by William Holt
U.S. House of Representatives
Preceded by District created	Member of the U.S. House of Representatives from Virginia's 10th congressional district 1789–1793	Succeeded by Carter B. Harrison
Preceded by District created	Member of the U.S. House of Representatives from Virginia's 13th congressional district 1793–1795	Succeeded by John Clopton
