= Battle of Stralsund (1809) =

1809 battle of the Dano-Swedish War of 1808–1809

- Part of the Dano-Swedish War of 1808–1809 and Franco-Swedish War
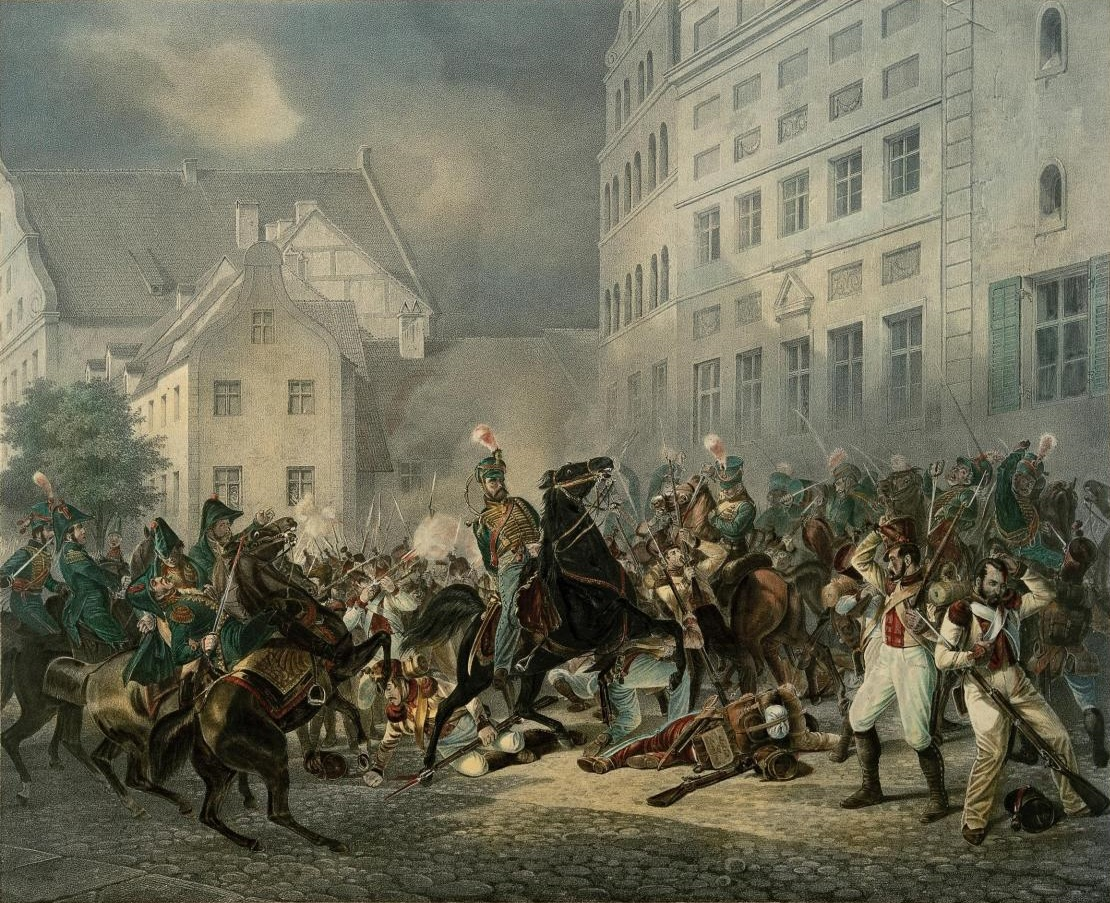
- Schill's death at Stralsund, Friedrich Hohe
Date	31 May 1809
Location	Stralsund, Swedish Pomerania 54°18′33″N 13°04′55″E
Result	French victory

Belligerents
France; Denmark–Norway; Holland	Prussia; Sweden

Commanders and leaders
Pierre Guillaume Gratien (Denmark–Norway) Johann Ewald	(Kingdom of Prussia) Ferdinand von Schill † (Sweden) Friedrich Gustav von Petersson (executed)

Strength
5,270	Prussia: 990; Sweden: 500

Casualties and losses
241 killed or wounded	300–400 killed or wounded 568 captured

Dano-Swedish War of 1808–1809:
Rebellion Stralsund
The color black indicates the current battle.

The Battle of Stralsund took place on 31 May 1809 during the Dano-Swedish War of 1808–1809 and Franco-Swedish War, both part of the larger Napoleonic Wars. It was fought between Prussian freikorps under Ferdinand von Schill and French, Dutch and Dano-Norwegian troops in Stralsund. In a "vicious street battle", Schill's army was defeated and he was killed in action.

== Background ==
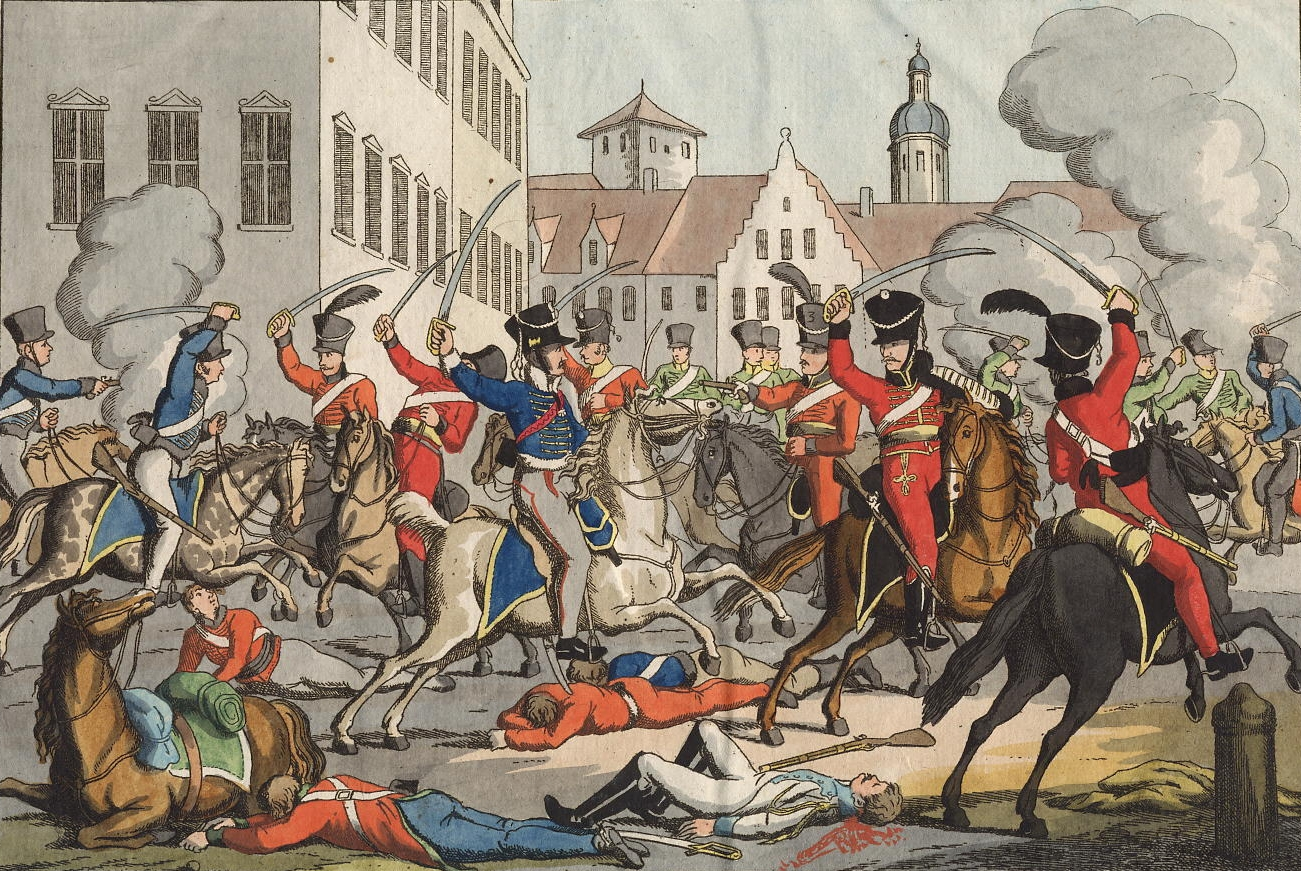
The death of Ferdinand von Schill

Stralsund, a port at the Baltic Sea in Swedish Pomerania, was surrendered to France after the siege of 1807 during the War of the Fourth Coalition. During this war, Prussian captain Ferdinand von Schill distinguished himself by cutting off French supply lines using guerrilla tactics in 1806. In 1807, he raised a freikorps and successfully fought the French forces in what he intended to become a patriotic insurrection. When his corps was disbanded after the Peace of Tilsit on 9 July 1807, Schill was promoted to the rank of a major, decorated with the Pour le Mérite, and became a hero of German resistance and patriotic movements.

In January and February 1809, the German resistance in French-held Westphalia invited Schill to lead an uprising. He agreed in April and drafted a proclamation which was intercepted by the French, and left Berlin on 27 April when he was threatened with arrest. With a freikorps of 100 hussars, Schill headed southwest towards Westphalia to stir up an anti-French rebellion, but news of the French victory in the Battle of Ratisbon made him change his plans. Schill turned northwards to secure a port, hoping for relief by the British navy.

== Battle ==
Schill entered Stralsund on 25 May with 2,000 men. The freikorps was pursued by a French-led force of 6,000 Danes, Holsteiners, Dutch and French, who confronted Schill on 31 May inside of the town. By then, Schill had 1,490 troops at his command inside Stralsund, including 300 Swedes from the Rügen landwehr, as well as a militia of 200 former Swedish soldiers, under Friedrich Gustav von Petersson.

The Dutch auxiliaries, about 4,000 troops, were commanded by Pierre Guillaume Gratien, another 1,500 Danish troops were under general Johann von Ewald's command. Gratien's Dutch forces included the 6th and 9th infantry, 2nd Horse Regiment, two squadrons of hussars and two horse artillery batteries. They entered the town after storming the Tribseer Tor gate, and engaged Schill's freikorps in street fights. Schill, along with 300–400 of his men, had fallen. An additional 568 men were captured, including Petersson, who was executed four days later. Between 400 and 500 men had managed to escape. The Dutch had lost 173 men, and the Danes 68.

== Aftermath ==
Eleven of Schill's officers were taken to Brunswick, and later executed in Wesel following an order from Napoleon. More than five hundred of Schill's men went into captivity. Schill's head was sent to the Kingdom of Holland for display in Leyden's public library, and only in 1837 the head was buried in Brunswick.

Schill was not alone with his plans to stir up an insurrection of the Prussian people against the French occupation. Other prominent plotters were Frederick William, Duke of Brunswick and Kasper von Dörnberg. All of them saw the Austrian resistance and the resulting War of the Fifth Coalition as a chance to expel Napoleon Bonaparte from Northern Germany as well. France however proved to be the stronger party, and Schill's defeat in the streets of Stralsund put a definite end to all plans for a popular uprising.

== See also ==
- Pomerania during the Early Modern Age
- History of Pomerania (1806–1933)
