= Ferdinand von Schill =

Prussian Army officer

Ferdinand Baptista von Schill
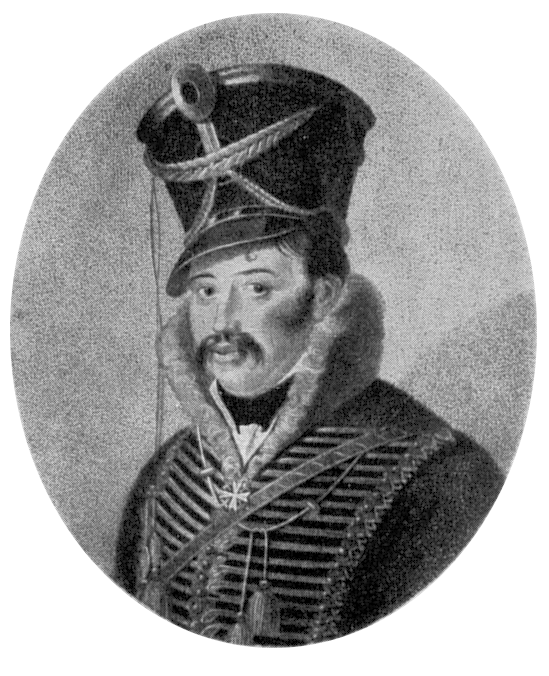
- Ferdinand von Schill
- Born: 6 January 1776; Wilmsdorf / Bannewitz, Electorate of Saxony, Holy Roman Empire of the German Nation
- Died: 31 May 1809 (aged 33); Stralsund, Swedish Pomerania
- Military career
- Allegiance: Prussia
- Branch: Prussian Army
- Service years: 1788/90–1809
- Rank: Major
- Commands: Freikorps Schill (de)
- Conflicts: Napoleonic Wars; Siege of Kolberg; Battle of Stralsund †

Major Ferdinand Baptista von Schill (6 January 1776 – 31 May 1809) was a Prussian Army officer who revolted unsuccessfully against France's occupation of the Kingdom of Prussia in May 1809. Von Schill's uprising ended at the Battle of Stralsund, a battle which also saw von Schill's own death in action. Outnumbered 3 to 1, Schill's Prussian Freikorps succumbed to a Napoleonic force supported by Dutch and Danish auxiliaries.

== Life ==
Ferdinand von Schill was born at Wilmsdorf (now a part of Bannewitz, Saxony) and entered the Prussian Army's cavalry at the age of twelve or fourteen (sources differ). His father, Johann-Georg Schill, had been an ambitious commoner from Bohemia, who attained the aristocratic "von" for his services to Austria and Saxony during the Seven Years' War. J.-G. von Schill had raised a "Freikorps", a small raiding party of cavalry and mounted infantry, operating behind enemy lines, and acquired some measure of fame and success. Many of Ferdinand von Schill's later biographers assumed that his father's example was an important influence on his subsequent career.

Ferdinand von Schill was a second-lieutenant in the Prussian 5th "Bayreuth" dragoons, re-designated the Queen's Dragoons in 1806, in honor of the popular Queen Louise. When Prussia and France went to war in October 1806, he was wounded at the battle of Auerstadt. From that field he escaped to Kolberg, where he played a very prominent part in the celebrated siege of 1806–07, as the commander of a Freikorps, raiding behind the French lines. After the Treaty of Tilsit, he was promoted to major, awarded the Pour le Mérite, and given the command of a hussar regiment formed primarily from his Kolberg men.

== Schill's revolution ==
In 1809 the political situation in Europe appeared to Schill to favor an attempt to liberate Germany from the French domination of Napoleon Bonaparte. He was an active member of the Tugendbund, the quasi-Masonic "League of Virtue" founded in June 1808, and including many notable Prussian reformers such as Gerhard von Scharnhorst and August Neidhardt von Gneisenau. It was banned in 1809. Many Tugendbund leaders believed that the new Kingdom of Westphalia, created by Napoleon from many smaller German states, and ruled by Napoleon's youngest brother Jérôme Bonaparte, was ripe for revolution. Schill planned to create an uprising in Westphalia that would topple the Bonaparte regime there, and – coupled with the efforts of Austria, Spain, and Britain – would bring about the fall of Napoleonic dominance in Germany.

Leading out his regiment from Berlin under pretext of manoeuvres, he raised the standard of revolt, and, joined by many officers and a company of light infantry, marched first south through Saxony, and then north-west into Westphalia. At the village of Dodendorf on 5 May 1809, he had a brush with the Magdeburg garrison and won a small victory. Schill had no difficulty defeating, or even recruiting, the unreliable Westphalian troops sent against him, and his rebellion swelled to over 2,000 men.

He had less success, however, with the gathering Danish and Dutch forces, which gradually drove him in a north-east direction toward the Baltic Sea. His most serious difficulty was the condemnation of Prussia's king Frederick William III, who feared that the revolt would drag a weakened and unprepared Prussia into another disastrous war against Napoleon. By the end of May, although he had left garrisons and raiding parties in various places, Schill's main force was trapped at Stralsund. He had between 1,500 and 2,000 men, against a force of 8,000 Danish and Dutch troops under French command.

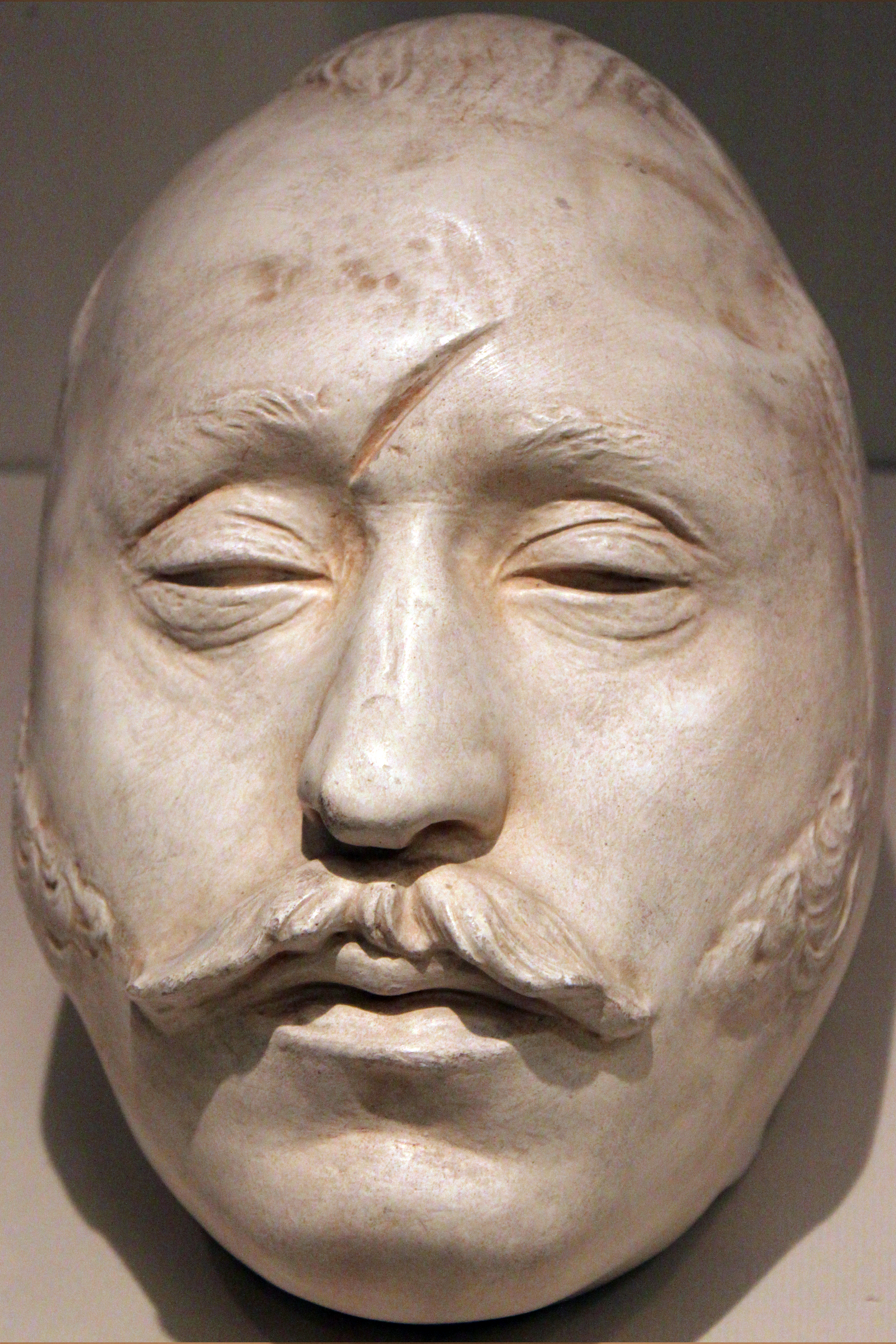
Ferdinand von Schill's death mask, Deutsches Historisches Museum Berlin

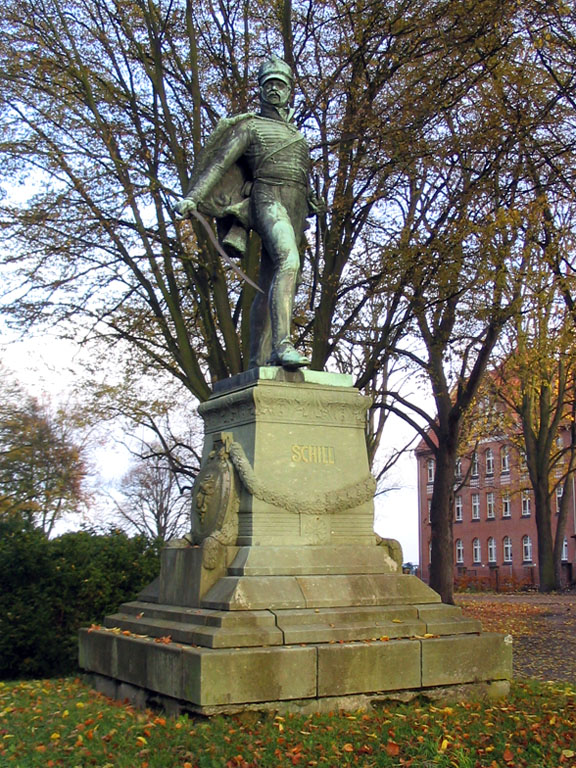
Ferdinand von Schill – Monument in Stralsund

=== Liberation fails ===
On 31 May the Napoleonic forces stormed Stralsund. Schill was killed in the street, by the Danish hussar Jaspar Krohn, fighting as his defenses collapsed. Over a thousand of his rebels escaped to Prussia, overland or by ship, where the officers were tried by court-martial, cashiered and imprisoned (although all were subsequently pardoned). Some smaller parties of rebels including his two brothers escaped to Sweden, and ultimately Austria and Britain, but the rest were either killed or taken. The French commander counted 570 prisoners, the majority of whom were then sent to the galleys. About 100 rebels who had been Westphalian deserters were separated and taken to Brunswick, where 14 of them were ultimately executed.

Schill's body was decapitated. The corpse was dumped in an unmarked grave in Stralsund. The head was sent to Jerome Bonaparte as a trophy, but he gave it to a Dutch surgeon who collected oddities, and it remained at the University of Leiden until 1837, when German patriots obtained it for the dedication of a Schill monument in Brunswick.

=== Schill's Eleven Officers ===
Eleven of Schill's officers were taken as a group to several different cities before their fate was sealed by Napoleon's orders. Eventually they were taken to the fortress of Wesel where they were given a show trial and executed on 16 September. The young group became tragic heroes and martyrs, and their appearance brought out crowds in every German-speaking town and city they went through. A dramatic letter-writing campaign led by Philippine von Griesheim, the fiancé of one of the eleven officers, Albrecht von Wedell, and appeals to the Prussian King Frederick William III by the eleven asking to die by a Prussian firing squad instead of at the 'hands of the enemy' helped create a legend that would become part of the propaganda encouraging the German liberation movement of 1813 leading to Prussia's restoration of independence.

One other close comrade of Schill's escaped execution and became known as 'The Twelfth'. Lieutenant Heinrich von Wedell had served with Schill as far back as the Siege of Kolberg. He was badly wounded at the battle of Dodendort and had to remain behind there. He was captured and interrogated by the French. Heinrich managed to convince the French that he had participated against his will and so he was sent to France, physically branded a criminal, and served eight months on a prison ship and then hard labor in a prison quarry before eventually being released in early 1812 in anticipation of the impending war with Russia. He was the cousin of Carl and Albrecht von Wedell who were among the eleven Schill officers executed at Wesel.

Another of Schill's officers, the Swede Friedrich-Gustave Peterson was executed by firing squad in Stralsund.

== Legacy ==
By the 1830s, Major von Schill was widely considered a hero throughout Germany. Monuments and historical markers to him or to his rebels have been erected in towns and cities: Wesel, Stralsund, Braunschweig, Wilmersdorf, Potsdam, Ohlau, Cottbus, Anklam, Geldern, and Wittenberg.

Military units were named after him (most notably the last division fielded by the Wehrmacht during World War II, the Infantry Division Ferdinand von Schill of late April 1945), streets and plazas bear his name to this day. Over 400 biographies, novels, plays, operas, and collections of poetry have been published about him in German, and he is featured in over a dozen German films including Rudolf Meinert's 1926 silent film The Eleven Schill Officers and his 1932 sound remake.
