= William Finnie (professor) =

American academic

William C. Finnie is an adjunct business professor at Washington University in St. Louis. Finnie is a contributing editor at Strategy and Leadership and has written Hands-On Strategy: the Guide to Crafting Your Company's Future.
