= William Finnie (mayor) =

American politician

William Finnie was mayor of Williamsburg, Virginia from 1783 to 1784.

During the American Revolution, he served the southern department of the Continental Army as adjutant quartermaster-general.

The William Finnie House is considered classic Williamsburg architecture.

Political offices
Preceded by William Holt	Mayor of Williamsburg, Virginia; 1783–1784	Succeeded by incomplete record
