= Carl von Donop =

Hessian colonel

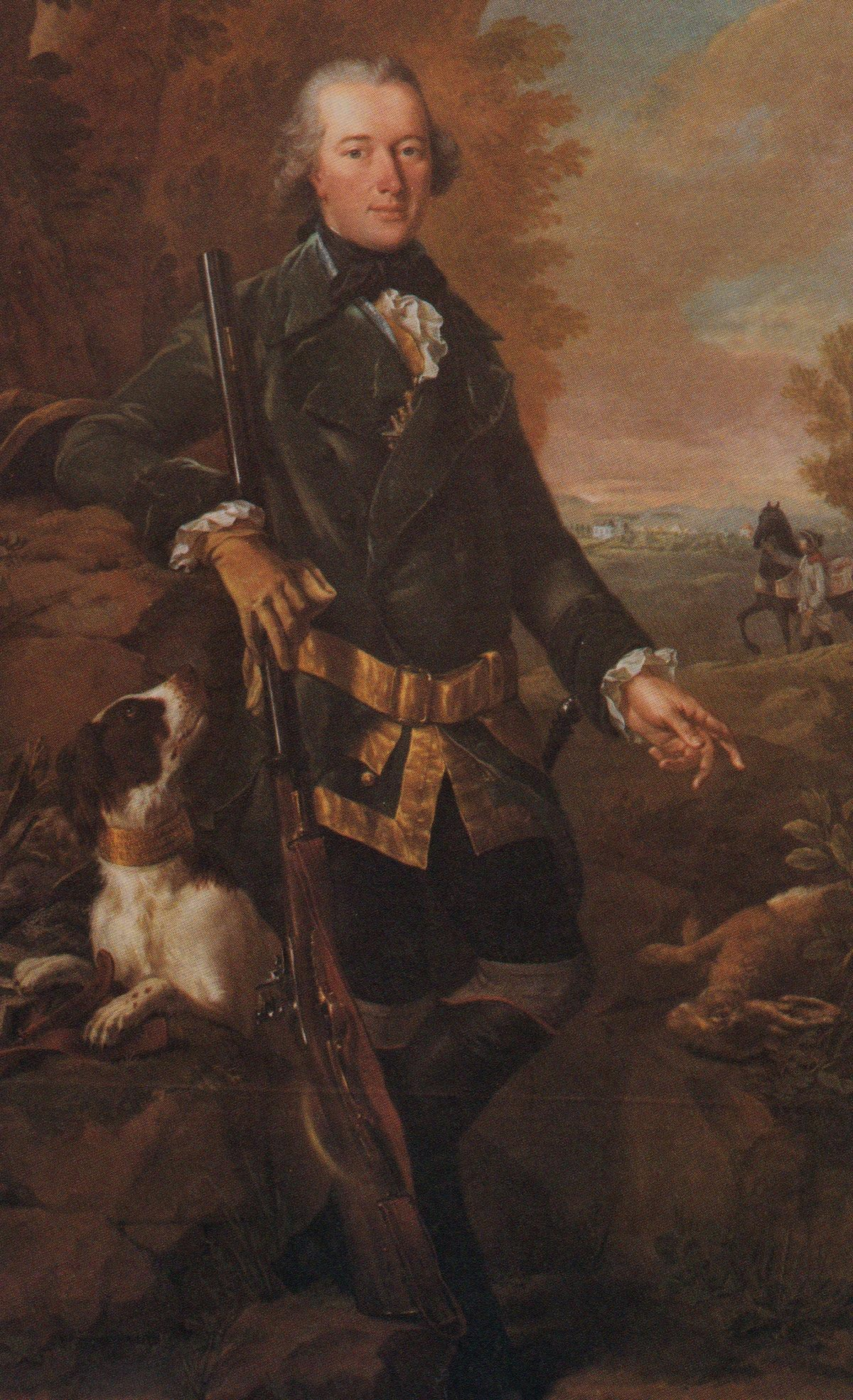
- Born: Carl Emil Ulrich von Donop; 1 January 1732; Landgraviate of Hesse-Kassel
- Died: 25 October 1777 (aged 45); Red Bank, Fort Mercer, New Jersey
- Burial place: Red Bank Battlefield
- Military career
- Allegiance: Hesse-Kassel
- Branch: Infantry
- Conflicts: Seven Years' War; American Revolutionary War; New York and New Jersey campaign; Battle of Long Island; Landing at Kip's Bay; Battle of Harlem Heights; Battle of Iron Works Hill; Philadelphia campaign; Battle of Red Bank (DOW)

Carl Emil Ulrich von Donop (1 January 1732 – 25 October 1777) was a Hessian colonel who fought in the American Revolutionary War. He died of wounds during the Battle of Red Bank.

== Biography ==
=== Origins and ambitions ===
The son of a noble family of Hesse-Kassel (or Hesse-Cassel), Donop was well connected in the European courts and served as personal adjutant to the Landgrave of Hesse-Kassel. He served with distinction in the Seven Years' War. When the American Revolutionary War began, Donop asked for leave to fight against the revolutionaries. The Landgrave appointed him to command four battalions of grenadiers and the prestigious Jäger Corps. A highly ambitious officer, Donop hoped to remain in North America after the war, to pursue dreams of power and glory.

Wearing a veneer of civility, and deferential to his superiors, Donop was an able officer but was not well liked by his subordinates. To his inferiors he was short-tempered and harsh, and he had a take-no-prisoners policy that was enforced by severe beatings.

=== Early battles ===
Donop's troops took part in the initial British landing on Long Island, New York, on 22 August 1776, and in the ensuing Battle of Long Island on 27 August. They also participated in the landing at Kip's Bay on Manhattan Island on the night of 14 September. Donop distinguished himself at the Battle of Harlem Heights, going to the aid of the British troops involved.

=== Retreat after Battle of Trenton ===
Donop was the senior officer present in southern New Jersey in late 1776, and commanded the garrisons in Trenton, Burlington, and Bordentown, which consisted of several Hessian battalions, the 42nd (Highland) Regiment of Foot (commanded by Colonel Stirling), and Jäger detachments. His main camp was at Bordentown prior to the Battle of Trenton, with one battalion occupying the town and the rest billeted along the country roads in Slabtown [Jacksonville] Black Horse [Columbus] Burlington City and White Hill (the Mary Field Plantation). His overall commander was Major General James Grant. Donop wanted to absorb Colonel Johann Rall's brigade into his garrison to fortify Trenton, but William Howe was persuaded to let Rall hold command on his own in Trenton. Warned by local Loyalists of impending attack, Donop warned Grant, who dismissed these cautions.

On 22 December 1776, Colonial militia under the command of Colonel Samuel Griffin attacked Donop's southern outposts at Slabtown. This force of colonials was sent from Philadelphia by General Israel Putnam as a deterrent to further encroachment on the river crossings opposite the colonial capitol at Philadelphia. The colonials numbered about 900 local militia and a few regulars, while Donop commanded over two thousand veterans.

In response to this attack, Donop moved his entire force south, pushing the colonials through Mount Holly at the Battle of Iron Works Hill and onto the opposite side of the Rancocas Creek. On Christmas Eve, the colonials retreated a few miles to Moorestown. Donop's officers wanted him to return to Bordentown, within easy supporting distance for Rall. Donop had nothing but contempt for Rall and decided to spend Christmas in the company of "a beautiful young widow" - as reported by his Captain of Jägers, Johann Ewald. There is some speculation, but no proof, that the "beautiful young widow" was Betsy Ross. A rider brought news of the disaster at Trenton about mid-day on 26 December. Out of position, and fearing he would be cut off from the remaining Royal Forces, Donop ordered his corps to move through Crosswicks to Princeton. He left a rear guard and allowed for baggage wagons, wounded and such to be brought along. He abandoned a good bit of plunder in his excitement and urgency. The victory at Trenton was won by Washington, but some credit should be given to the young widow who held Donop out of position a day too long to be of help to Rall.

=== Battle of Red Bank ===
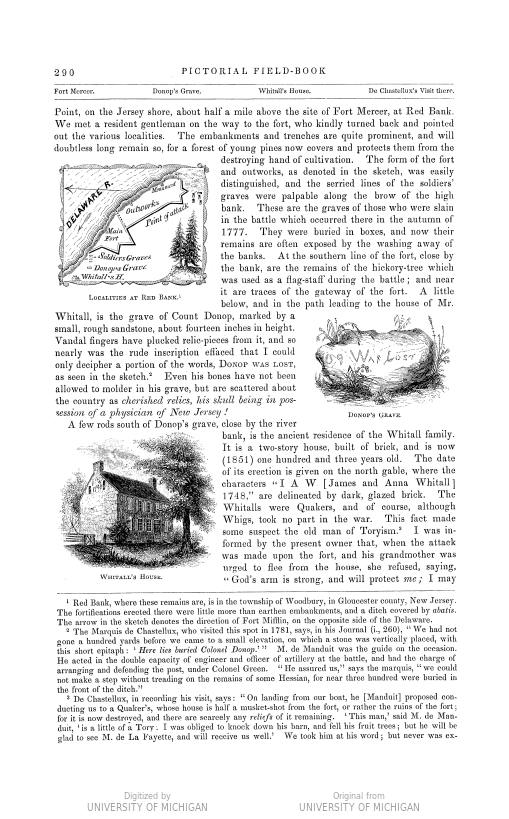
Von Donop Gravesite Battlefield of Red Bank

When Howe's forces captured Philadelphia in 1777, he then acted to open the Delaware River to the British navy. The effort was directed at the forts on either side of the river. The Royal Navy on the Delaware River, under the command of Admiral Francis Reynolds, attacked Fort Mifflin in Pennsylvania. In an attempt to recoup his tarnished reputation from his defeat at Trenton, Donop volunteered to attempt the capture of Fort Mercer at Red Bank in what is now National Park, New Jersey. General Howe agreed, if it could be done easily, and gave Donop command of 2,000 Hessian mercenary troops, with which he crossed the Delaware River on 22 October. That afternoon, Donop surrounded the fort and demanded surrender from Colonel Christopher Greene with the threat of invasion and no quarter. Greene, in a strong position with 400 Rhode Islanders and in possession of plentiful cannon, grapeshot, and powder, rejected the demand. Donop led 1,200 Hessians in three attacks on the fort, all of which were beaten back, resulting in nearly 400 Hessian casualties, including Donop himself. Fatally wounded in what would be known as the Battle of Red Bank, Donop died two days later on 25 October 1777. He said to a brother officer before he died: "It is finishing a noble career early; but I die the victim of my ambition, and of the avarice of my sovereign." He was buried on the Battlefield where he had been wounded.

== Sources ==
- Fischer, David Hackett (2004). Washington's Crossing. New York: Oxford University Press. ISBN 0-19-517034-2.
- Philip R. N. Katcher, Encyclopedia of British, Provincial and German Army Units 1775-1783 (Harrisburg, Penna.: Stackpole Books, 1973).
- Rodney Atwood, The Hessians (Cambridge, 1980).
