= Van Horne House =

Historic house in New Jersey, United States

- U.S. National Register of Historic Places
- New Jersey Register of Historic Places
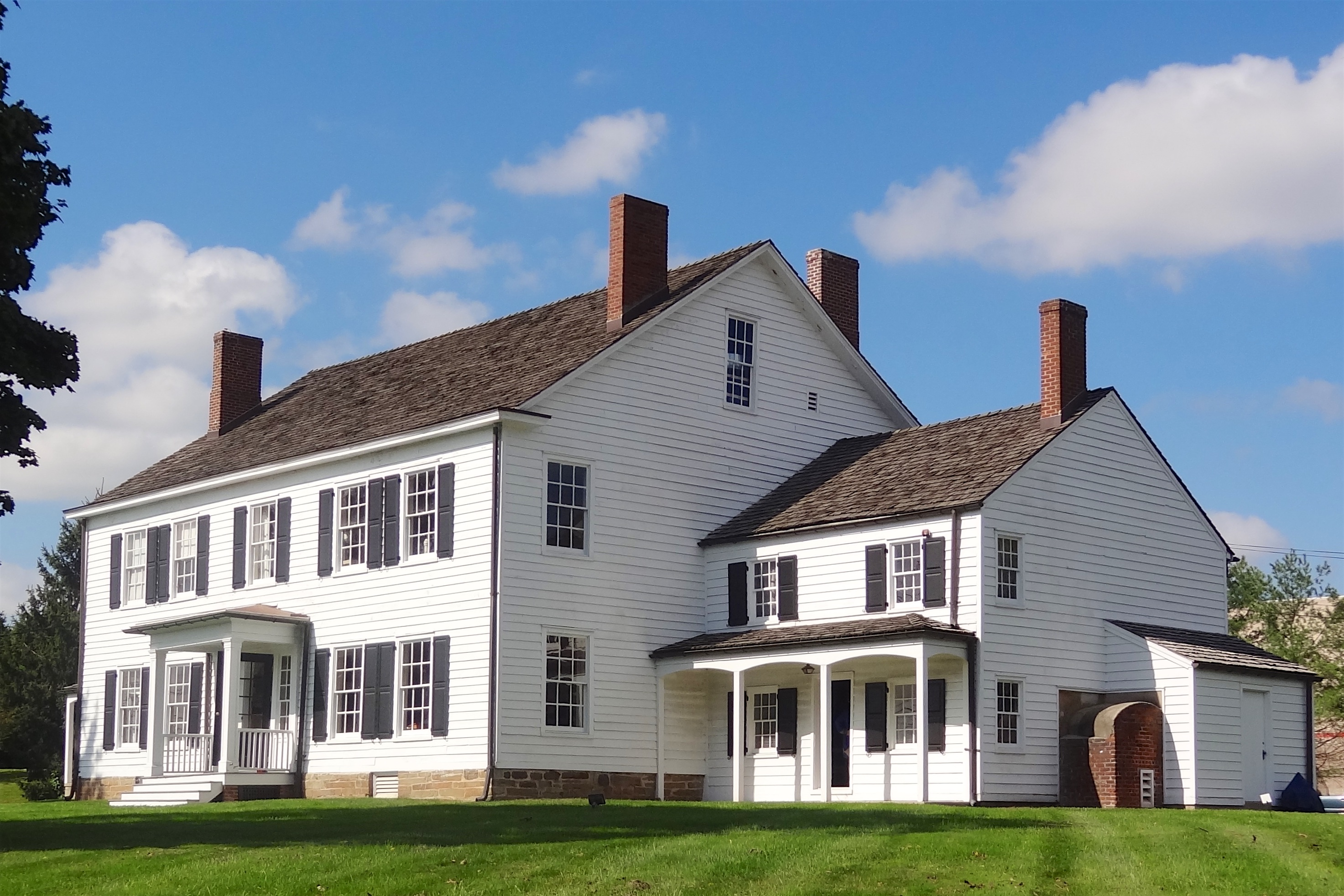
- Van Horne House, 2013

- Location within Somerset County, New Jersey Location within New Jersey Location within the United States
- Location: 941 East Main Street; Bridgewater, New Jersey
- Coordinates: 40°33′42″N 74°33′5″W
- Area: 2 acres (0.81 ha)
- Built: c. 1750
- Architectural style: Colonial Revival
- NRHP reference No.: 02000133
- NJRHP No.: 3719

Significant dates
- Added to NRHP: March 8, 2002
- Designated NJRHP: December 20, 2001

The Van Horne House is a historic building at 941 East Main Street near Bound Brook in Bridgewater Township, Somerset County, New Jersey. The house was built c. 1750 and also known as Phil's Hill, after its owner, Philip Van Horne. It served as the headquarters for American General Benjamin Lincoln in 1777, during the American Revolutionary War, in particular the Battle of Bound Brook. Later, it served as the headquarters for American General William Alexander, Lord Stirling during the second Middlebrook encampment (1778–79). The house, on the early-18th-century Old York Road that connected Philadelphia to New York City, was a New Jersey landmark during the war. Since 2002, the Heritage Trail Association has used the house as its headquarters, including an exhibit space. It was added to the National Register of Historic Places on March 8, 2002, for its locally significant Colonial Revival architecture from 1937 to 1944.

== History ==
Between 1683 and 1685, Thomas Codrington, a merchant from New York City, purchased 2,754 acres between the Raritan River and the First Watchung Mountain from the East Jersey proprietors. In 1706, he sold the property to Phillip French, who left it to his three daughters. This tract was later split between Cornelius Van Horne, husband of Elizabeth French, and Joseph Reade, husband of Anne French, as recorded in a 1722 deed. Jacob Janeway purchased an 84-acre lot that included the site of the house, c. 1735. Philip Van Horne (1719–1793), son of Cornelius, then purchased the lot from Janeway's estate in 1750.

During the French and Indian War, Philip Van Horne was a colonel in the Somerset County militia. In 1759, he was appointed a judge in the Court of Common Pleas for Somerset County. He was known for his great hospitality, to both sides of the war, and his house became known as Convivial Hall or Convivial Hill. Andrew D. Mellick Jr. in his book, The Story of an Old Farm, reports that Van Horne had "five handsome and well-bred daughters who were the much admired toasts of both armies." His eldest daughter, Mary Ricketts, married Irish American Colonel Stephen Moylan on September 12, 1778. American Captain Alexander Graydon (1752–1818) writes that: "His house, used as a hotel, seemed constantly full." and notes that General George Washington was concerned:

I wish you had brought Vanhorne off with you, for from his noted Character, there is no dependance to be placed upon his Parole.

— General George Washington

Mellick writes:

at one time Washington contemplated his removal to New Brunswick. Indeed he was arrested and put on parole, but was permitted to remain at Middlebrook

At the Battle of Bound Brook, on April 13, 1777, Van Horne hosted British General Charles Cornwallis for breakfast and American Generals Benjamin Lincoln and Nathanael Greene for supper.

During the second Middlebrook encampment (winter of 1778–79), Major General William Alexander, Lord Stirling used the house as his headquarters. Stirling took over command of the Middlebrook encampment on December 21, 1778, when Washington left to meet with Congress in Philadelphia, until he returned about February 5, 1779. General Henry Lee, Light-Horse Harry, and other officers were also quartered here.

On October 26, 1779, British Lt. Col. John Graves Simcoe led a group of the Queen's Rangers to search for and capture New Jersey Governor William Livingston or Colonel Moylan. He raided several houses in Bound Brook before arriving here, but did not find his targets. After taking prisoners at the house, he continued on to Van Veghten's Bridge.

In 1934, the house was purchased by the Calco Chemical Company, later American Cyanamid. The company had previously established a large manufacturing facility on the adjoining property, starting in 1916. Starting in 1937, company executive John McMurray had the house restored, "in colonial period", to be used as corporate guest quarters. During World War II, the company noted in its April 1944 newsletter:

Charm notwithstanding in the revolutionary fame of the Van Horne house, Calco workers may be proud that the restored mansion now plays a vital part in the present war by providing the necessary office space for the department responsible for the sale of sulfa-drugs not only to the drug trade but to the armed forces all over the world.

== Description ==
The house is two stories with a gable roof. The stone foundation is from the 18th century. The house was remodeled by the Calco Chemical Company between 1937 and 1944 using a 20th-century Colonial Revival style. It is on a hill north of the Old York Road and west of the Middle Brook.

== Gallery ==
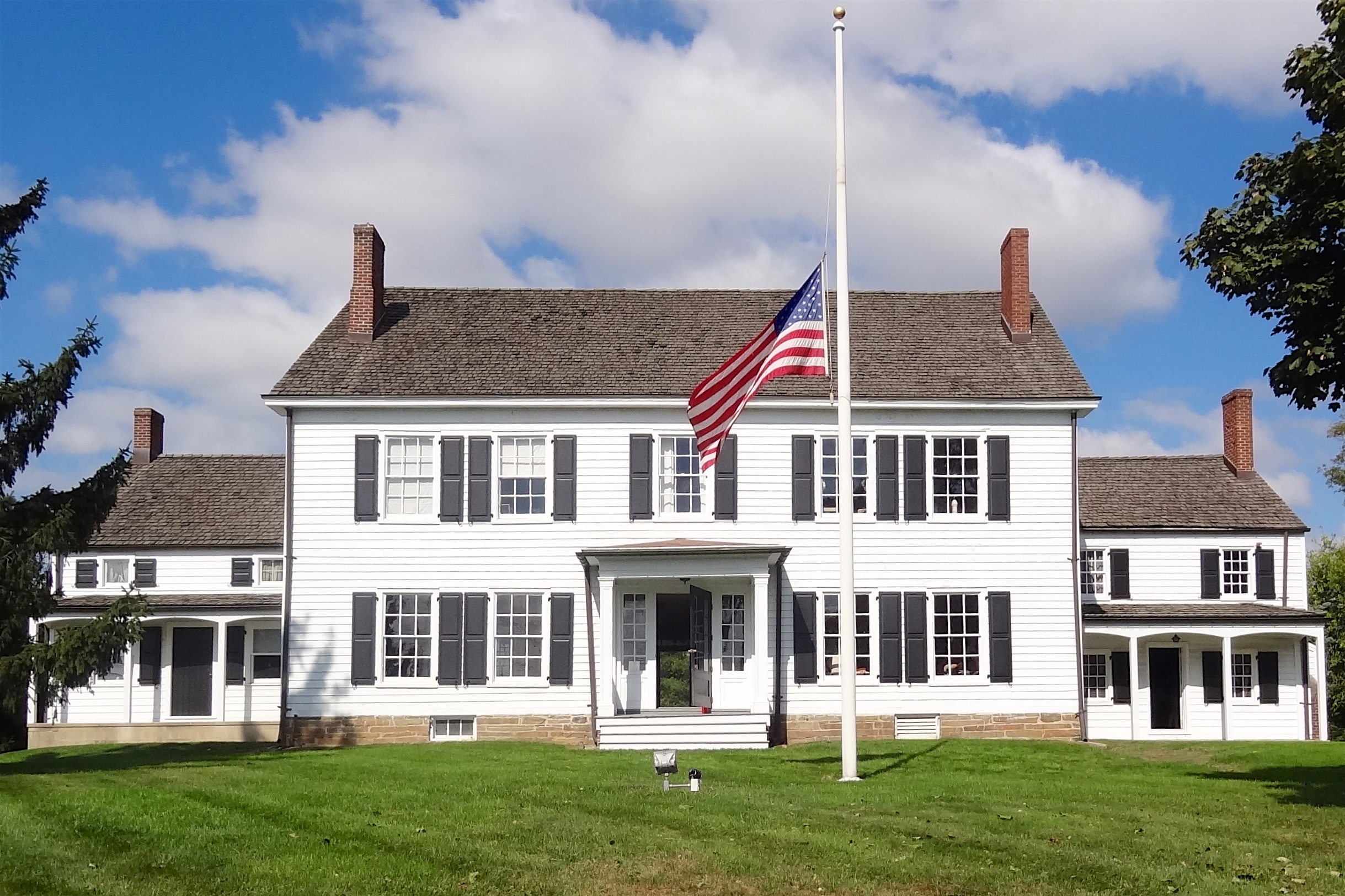
Front view, looking north

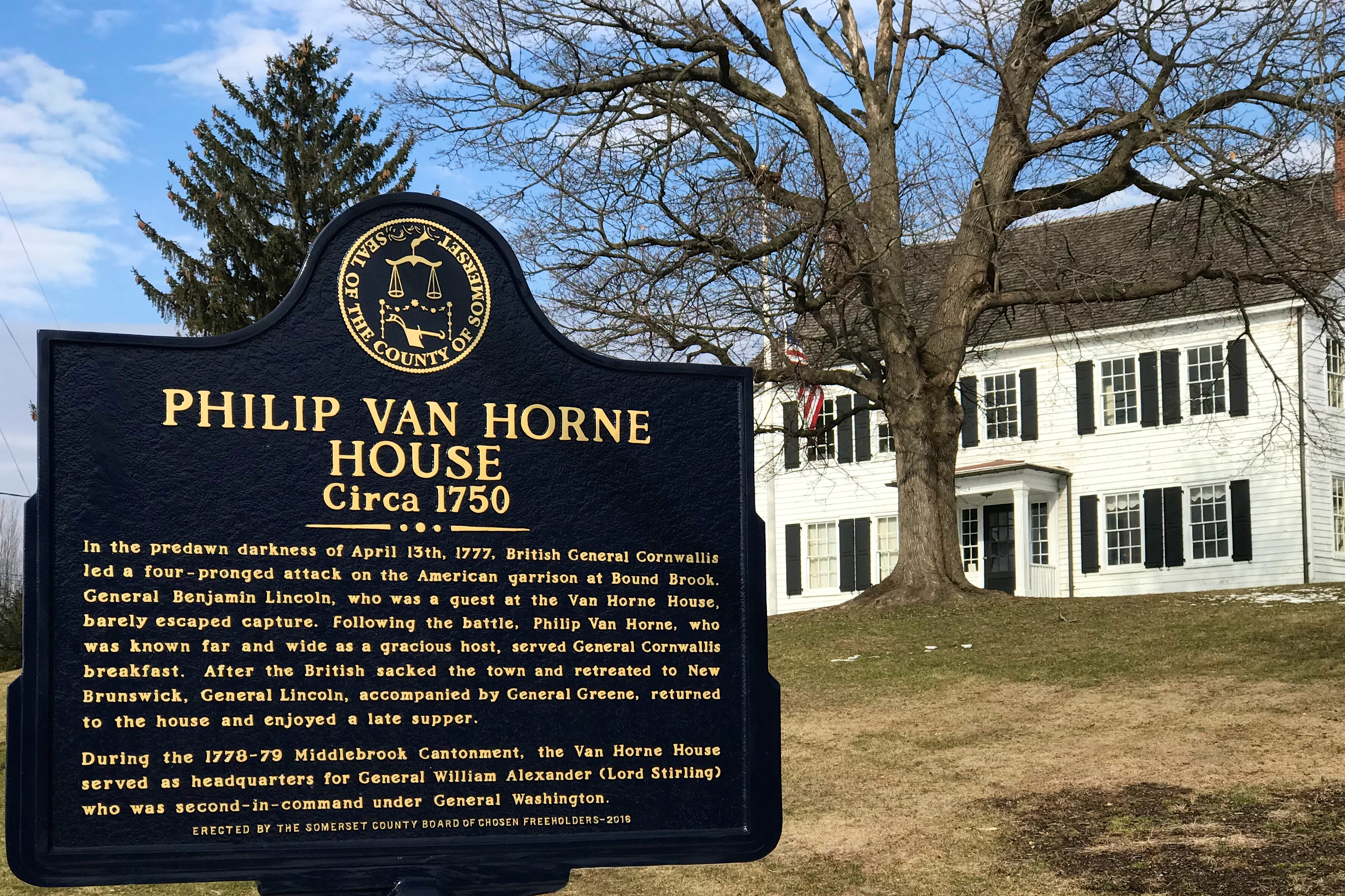
Somerset County historical information

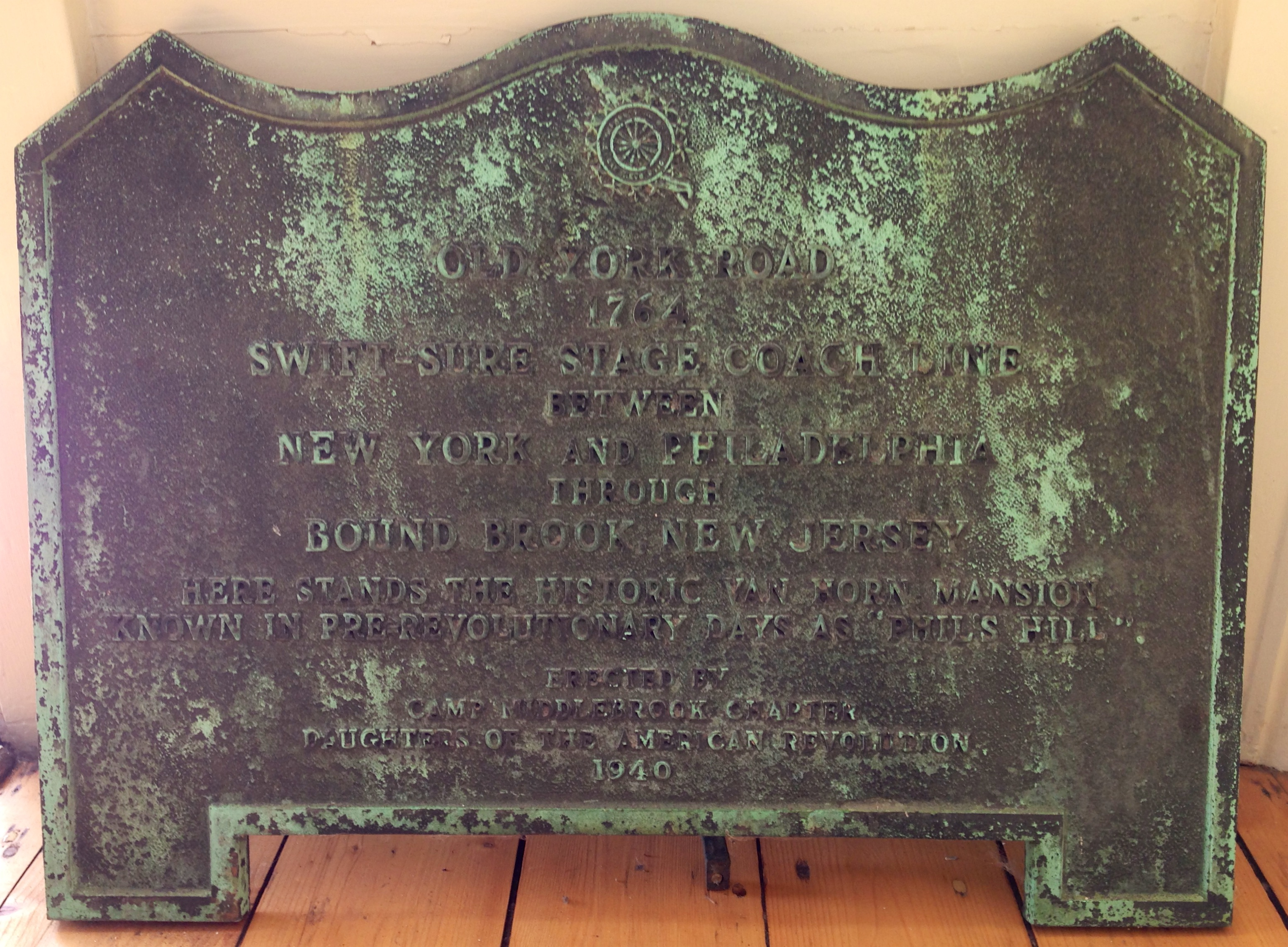
Old York Road bronze tablet

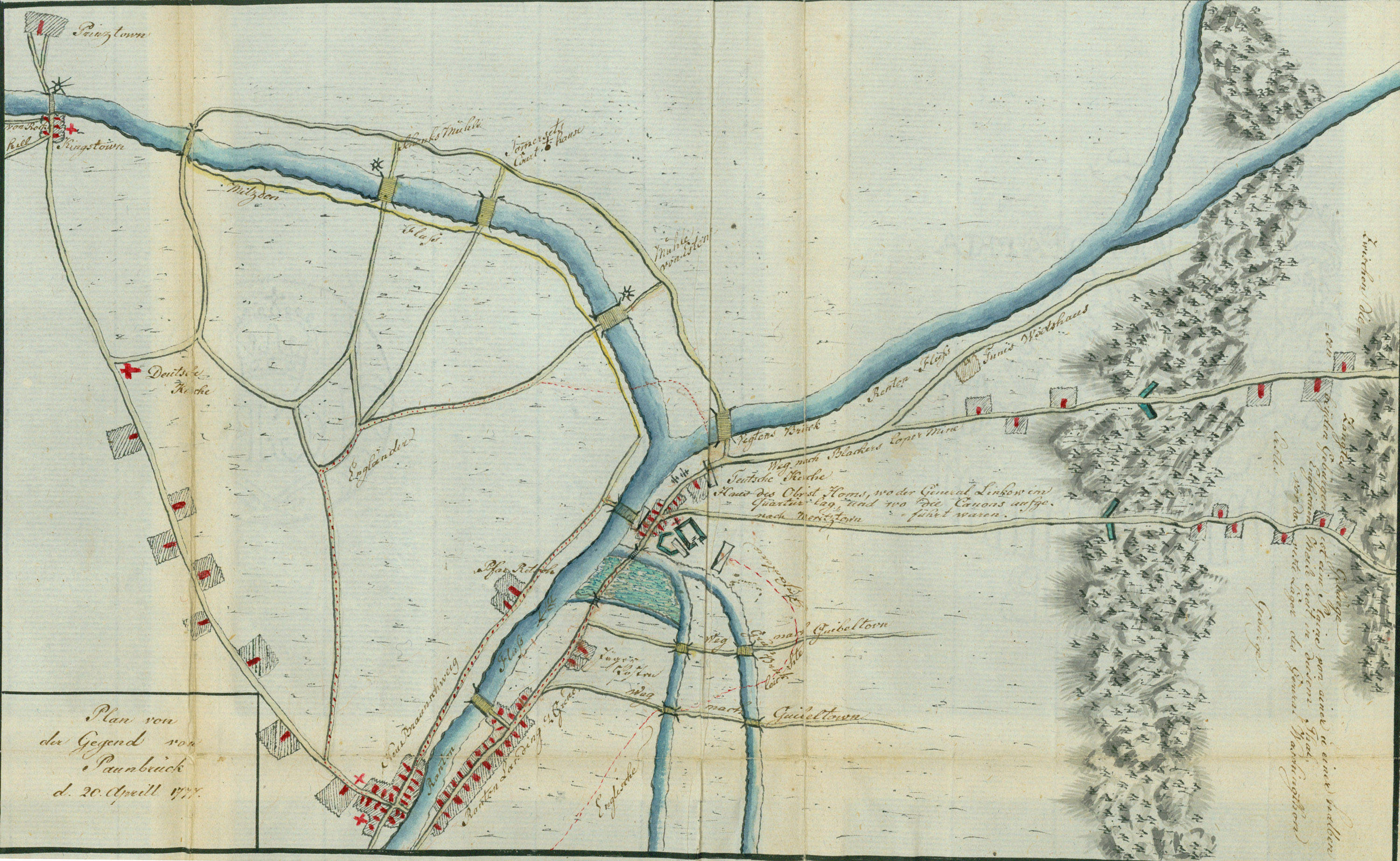
Plan of the Battle of Bound Brook by Johann von Ewald

== See also ==
Other houses used as headquarters during the second Middlebrook encampment (1778–79):

- Wallace House – General George Washington
- Van Veghten House – General Nathanael Greene
- Staats House – General Friedrich Wilhelm von Steuben
- Jacobus Vanderveer House – General Henry Knox
