= Old York Road =

Road between Pennsylvania and New Jersey

Coordinates: 40.062°N 75.136°W

Route information
- Existed: 1711–present

Major junctions
- South end: Philadelphia, Pennsylvania, U.S.
- North end: Elizabeth, New Jersey, U.S.

Location
- Country: United States

Highway system

Old York Road, originally York Road, with reference to New York, is a roadway that was built during the 18th century to connect Philadelphia with New York City.

The road was built along the Raritan tribe's Naraticong Trail, also known as the Tuckaraming Trail. A memorial plaque to the friendship of the Naraticong tribe, who permitted the road to be built over their trail, is located at the intersection of Old York Road and Canal in Raritan, New Jersey. The Swift Sure Stage Coach Line completed the journey between the two cities in two days.

A ferry left Elizabethtown Point for New York City, or passengers could continue onto Newark, New Jersey and ultimately Powles Hook Ferry in present day Exchange Place in Jersey City via Bergen Point Plank Road/Newark Plank Road.

== Pennsylvania route ==
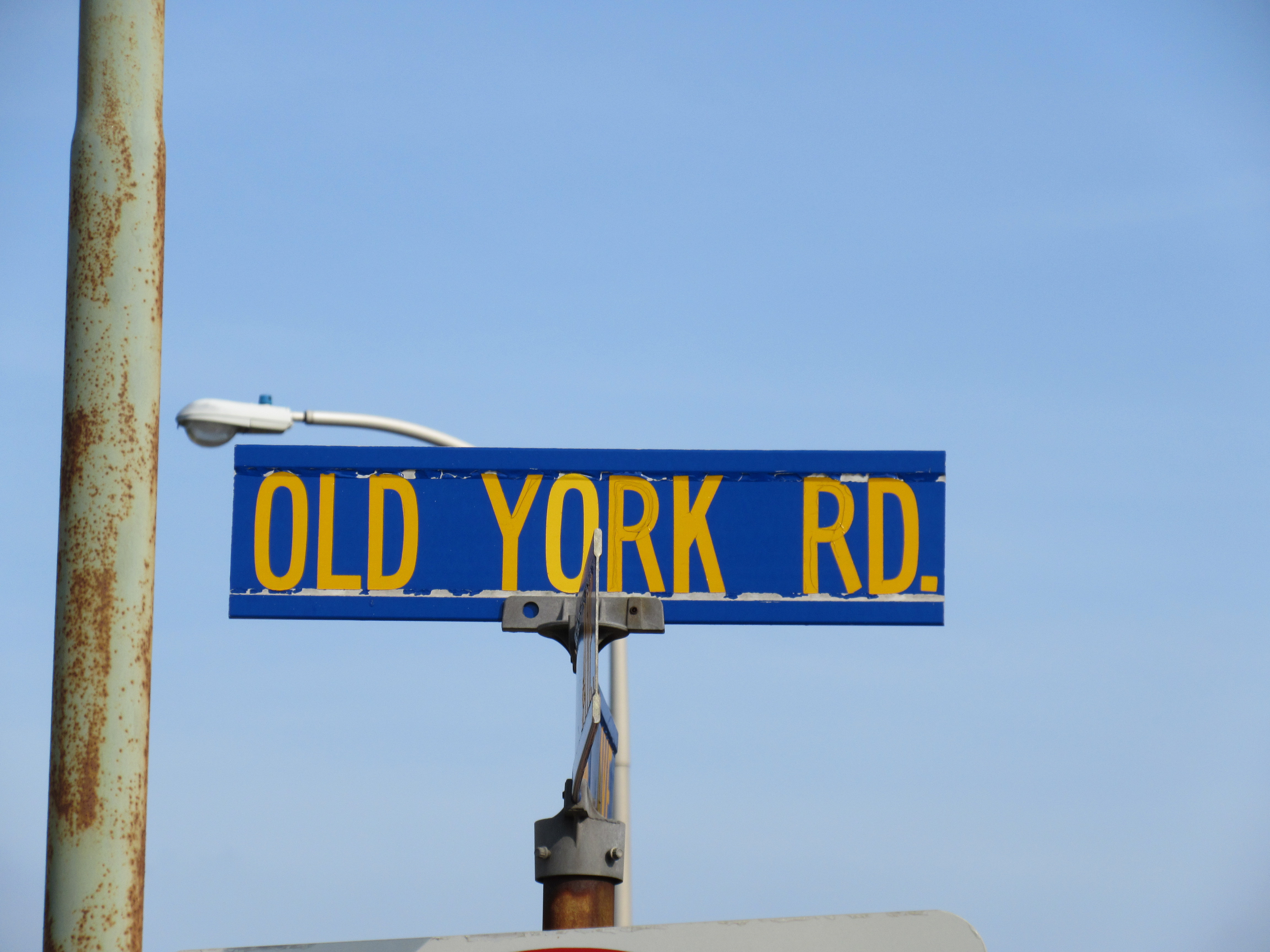
Sign for Old York Road in Cheltenham Township, Pennsylvania

Old York Road was laid out from New Hope, Pennsylvania to Philadelphia between 1711 and 1771. Its start (or end) point was at the intersection of Fourth and Vine Streets.

Motorists demanded the abolition of the road's tolls from City Line Ave to Bucks County in 1916.

An urban redevelopment project during the 1960s removed most of Old York Road between Vine and Spring Garden Streets, although a remnant remains as the unmarked alley midway between 5th and 4th Streets at Willow Street. North of Spring Garden Street, the Old York Road went through what is now lower North Philadelphia on a roadbed that is now Fifth Street.

A section still named Old York Road begins at the intersection of Germantown Avenue and West Westmoreland Street in the Rising Sun/Franklinville neighborhood of North Philadelphia. The road continues north and runs concurrently with Pennsylvania Route 611 (PA 611) at the intersection with North Broad Street and Oak Lane in the neighborhood East Oak Lane in North Philadelphia.

Old York Road (known as York Road north of the border between Abington Twp. and Upper Moreland Twp. in Willow Grove) deviates from PA 611 at the intersection with Easton Road in Willow Grove, where it begins to run concurrently with PA 263, which is still named York Road (not Old York Road). From there north, with a pattern that is common for naming old roads, some sections of the oldest road route road still exist in a few areas, each with a name beginning "Old", in this case Old York Road. This occurs in the village of Hartsville, which sits astride the border of Warminster and Warwick Township as well as the village of Bridge Valley in Buckingham, about 3 miles (4.8 km) south of where PA 263/York Road joins US 202. An 8-arch stone bridge over the Neshaminy Creek, built in 1804, still stands on Old York Road in Bridge Valley, but was only open to pedestrian and bicycle traffic since that section of road was bypassed by the 4-lane York Road in 1965 until the bridge was closed to foot traffic by a cyclone fence at each end in 2010. The section of PA 263/York Road from Sugar Bottom Rd. to PA 413 in Buckingham Twp. was resurfaced in 2008-09 for the first time since the 1965 widening, and the section through Warwick Township was scheduled to be repaved in 2010–11. As of 2025, that had long been completed.

In Lahaska, Old York Road follows US-202 as Lower York Road. Old York Road follows PA 179 into New Hope, as Bridge Street. It deviates briefly and rejoins PA 179. The road forks ahead, with Ferry Street going southeast and Bridge Street going northeast. Bridge Street carries PA 179 across the New Hope-Lambertville Bridge, into New Jersey. The original bridge was built in 1814 and replaced twice after floods. The newest bridge was built in 1904 (a major renovation was performed in 2024-2025) and provides the closest route to the original Old York Road.

Ferry Street ends at the location of the first ferry dock of John Wells. In 1719, John Wells was given a license to establish a ferry at this location, two years after he bought the land. The Pennsylvania Assembly eventually gave John Wells sole right to operate a ferry from this spot after Thomas Canby attempted to compete with the service. The small village became known as Well's Ferry. Thomas Canby's son, Benjamin later bought the ferry service from Wells. In 1764, John Coryell, who operated a ferry from New Jersey bought the Pennsylvania ferry service from Benjamin Canby. The village later had the names of Canby's Ferry and Coryell's Ferry before receiving the name New Hope after a 1790 fire.

== New Jersey route ==
Old York Road began at Coryell's Ferry, which was on Emanuel Coryell's property between Church Street and Swan Creek (for which Swan Street is named) in Lambertville. Although this was not the first ferry operated from the New Jersey side, Coryell purchased land here and began operating a ferry service in 1732. The village on the New Jersey side began to be known as Coryell's Ferry. The original route followed Main Street to York Street and briefly joined with New Jersey Route 179, the modern Old York Road.

It continues on NJ 179 with three deviations, including one at Mount Airy, before crossing under US 202. NJ 179 ends in Ringoes and Old York Road continues on the beginning of County Route 514. At Reaville in East Amwell, Old York Road leaves CR 514 and joins CR 613. CR 613 continues through Three Bridges and ends at Pleasant Run Road in Centerville in Readington, but Old York Road continues across it and crosses US 202 in Branchburg.

Centerville was so named because of its position between Philadelphia and New York, which made it a resting place for the coaches, which originally took two days to complete the journey. Old York Road then follows CR 637 across US 202 again and joins CR 567 until Raritan.

In Raritan, it follows Somerset Street (CR 626) and joins with Main St (NJ 28) in Somerville. Old York Road continues to follow East Main Street, which becomes concurrent with CR 533 in Finderne in Bridgewater.

After going through Bound Brook, the Old York Road traveled through Middlesex on modern Raritan Avenue and NJ 28, which brought the route to the northern end of the Quibbletown (now New Market) area (now part of Dunellen). After crossing the path of the Central Railroad of New Jersey on Grove Street and New Market Road, it then roughly followed Front Street to The Plains and Scotch Plains. From there it went to West Fields by Park Avenue, Mountain Avenue, and the Jerusalem Road (now partly Brightwood Avenue, Embree Crescent, Eaglecroft Road, and Clark Street), and to Cranes Ford by Broad Street, Benson Place, 4th Avenue, and North Avenue. In what is now Cranford, it passed along what is now Lincoln Avenue, past Droeschers Mill. Much of the road from there to Elizabethtown was eliminated, though parts survive as Colonia Road and West End Avenue. The road is still extant south of a bend in Dehart Place, which it follows to Rahway Avenue. The Elizabeth River was crossed via Pearl Street, Washington Street (now abandoned), and Broad Street. The road then followed Elizabeth Avenue and 1st Avenue to Elizabethtown Point.

A ferry left from Elizabethtown Point in Elizabeth to Holland's Hook (now Port Ivory) on Staten Island beginning in 1736 by Adoniah Schuyler. Holland Hook was named for the early settlers, who came from Holland, but later the name evolved to Howland Hook.

== Transportation ==
- Swift Sure Stagecoach Line - In 1769 the stagecoach line was advertised, among other places, in the New York Gazette. The stagecoach was to leave the Barley Sheaf Tavern "at eight in the morning, arriving at Well's Ferry twelve hours later..." About 1827 there were three runs each week from Philadelphia to New York. Swift Sure continued operations until railroads superseded stagecoach travel.

== Landmarks ==
Source: Cawley & Cawley

=== Pennsylvania ===
- The Old York Road passed near the Betsy Ross House in Philadelphia, Pennsylvania.
- The Rising Sun Tavern stood at the crossroads of the Germantown Pike (now Germantown Avenue) and the Old York Road from the mid-18th to the late 19th centuries. It was a landmark for travelers on the Old York Road. An 18th- or 19th-century milestone in Abington Township still tells passing pedestrians, "9 to R S, 11 to P", meaning 9 miles to Rising Sun (the tavern and what was then the village around it) and 11 miles to Philadelphia [Old City].
- Site of the Battle of Crooked Billet. Marker just off Old York Rd. at 70-98 Meadowbrook Ave. Hatboro, PA 19040
- Site of The Log College, William Tennent's College for Presbyterian ministers, 1746. Warminster, Pennsylvania.
- Moland House, in Hartsville, Warwick Township, Bucks County, Pennsylvania. Washington's headquarters in August 1777.
- Buckingham Friends Meeting House, Buckingham Township, Pennsylvania. Used as a military hospital during the Revolutionary War.
- Ferry toll house at New Hope, Pennsylvania.

=== New Jersey ===
- Holcombe storehouse, in Mount Airy, New Jersey, c. 1743. On the National Register of Historic Places listings in Hunterdon County, New Jersey
- Ringo's Tavern, c. 1840, 1084 Old York Rd. in Ringoes, New Jersey.
- Andrew Ten Eyck House, Branchburg, New Jersey
- Wallace House, in Somerville, New Jersey, General George Washington's headquarters during the second Middlebrook encampment (1778–79), American Revolutionary War.
- Old Dutch Parsonage, in Somerville, New Jersey
- Somerset Hotel, previously known as Tunison's Tavern, in Somerville, New Jersey
- Van Veghten House, Finderne area, in Bridgewater Township, New Jersey, General Nathanael Greene's headquarters during the second Middlebrook encampment
- Van Horne House, in Bridgewater Township, New Jersey, General William Alexander, Lord Stirling's headquarters during the second Middlebrook encampment
- Middlebrook Hotel, 1700, former tavern in Middlebrook, New Jersey
- Drake House, Plainfield, New Jersey
- Stage House Inn also known as the Scotch Plains Tavern, Scotch Plains, New Jersey, built c. 1737
- Presbyterian Church in Westfield, New Jersey. Original Church built on site in 1735.
- Droeschers Mill in Cranford, NJ.
- Old First Presbyterian Church, founded 1664, Elizabeth, New Jersey
- Boxwood Hall, in Elizabeth, New Jersey
- Elizabethtown Port - Noted site of the landing of Captain Philip De Carteret in 1665. First Royal Governor of the Colony of New Jersey.

== See also ==
- King's Highway (Charleston to Boston)
- Nicholas Scull II

== Bibliography ==
- Cawley, James; Cawley, Margaret (1965). Along the Old York Road. New Brunswick, New Jersey: Rutgers University Press. ISBN 978-0-813-50487-2. OCLC 692143813.
- Faris, John Thomson (1917), Old roads out of Philadelphia, Philadelphia: J. B. Lippincott & Co..
