= Van Veghten's Bridge =

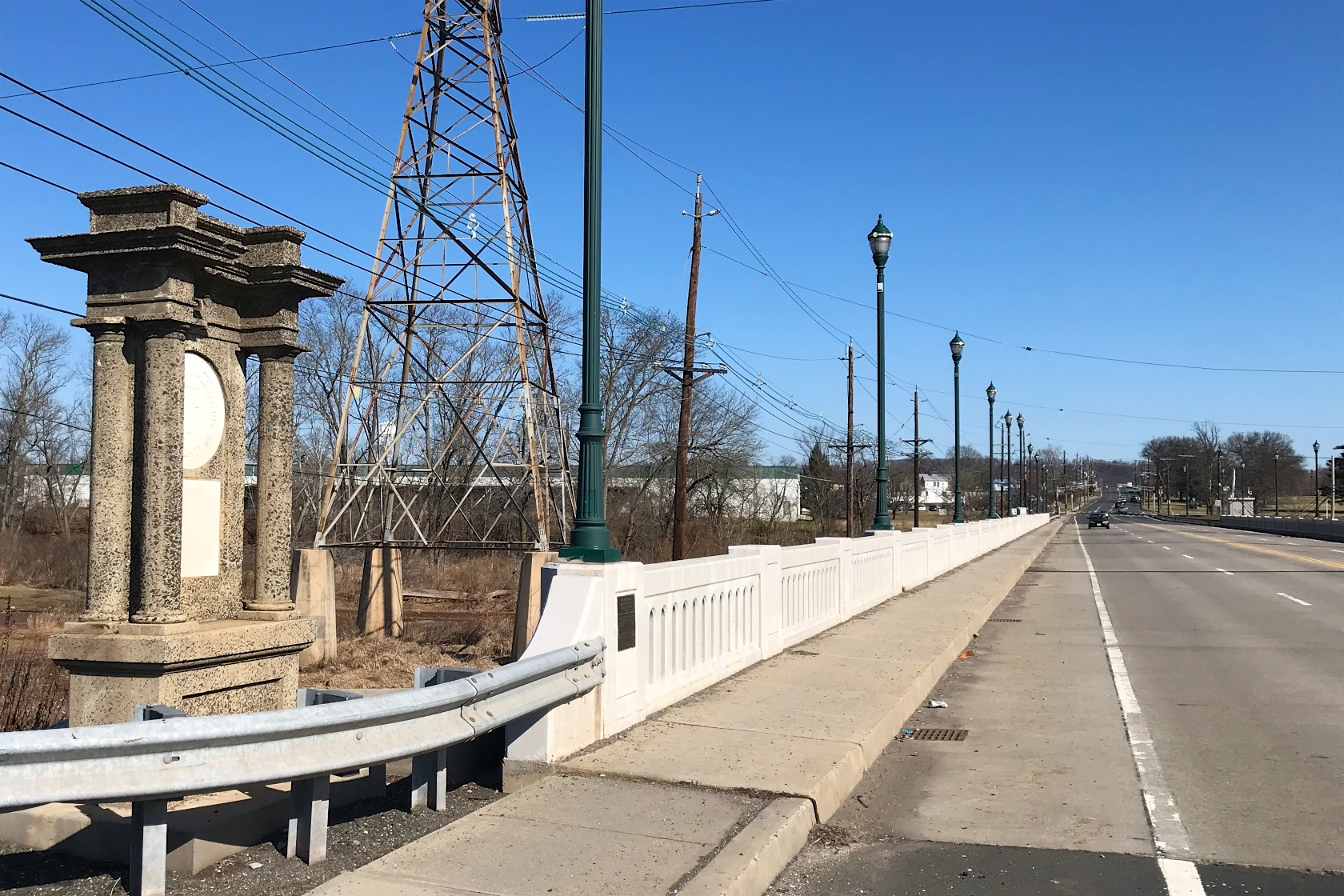
- Northbound, Van Veghten's Bridge, 2018
- Coordinates: 40°33′19″N 74°34′59″W
- Carries: CR 533
- Crosses: Raritan River
- Locale: Bridgewater, New Jersey and Manville, New Jersey

Location
- Interactive map of Van Veghten's Bridge

Van Veghten's Bridge is a bridge spanning the Raritan River in Somerset County, New Jersey, connecting the Finderne section of Bridgewater with Manville. The bridge carries four lanes of Somerset County Route 533 across the river and the flood plain. In Manville the roadway is called North Main Street. In Bridgewater, it becomes Finderne Avenue.

== Background ==
The first bridge at this site, known as Van Veghten's after the land owner, Van Veghten, was built in the early 18th century, perhaps as early as 1733. It was later rebuilt in 1774.

It was noted in several events during the American Revolutionary War. On October 26, 1779, British Lieut. Col. John Graves Simcoe led a group of the Queen's Rangers and destroyed eighteen boats on the Raritan River at this site that were intended for use by the American General George Washington. On August 30–31, 1781, the French Army under command of the French general Comte de Rochambeau, marched over the bridge, along the route to Yorktown, Virginia.

== History ==
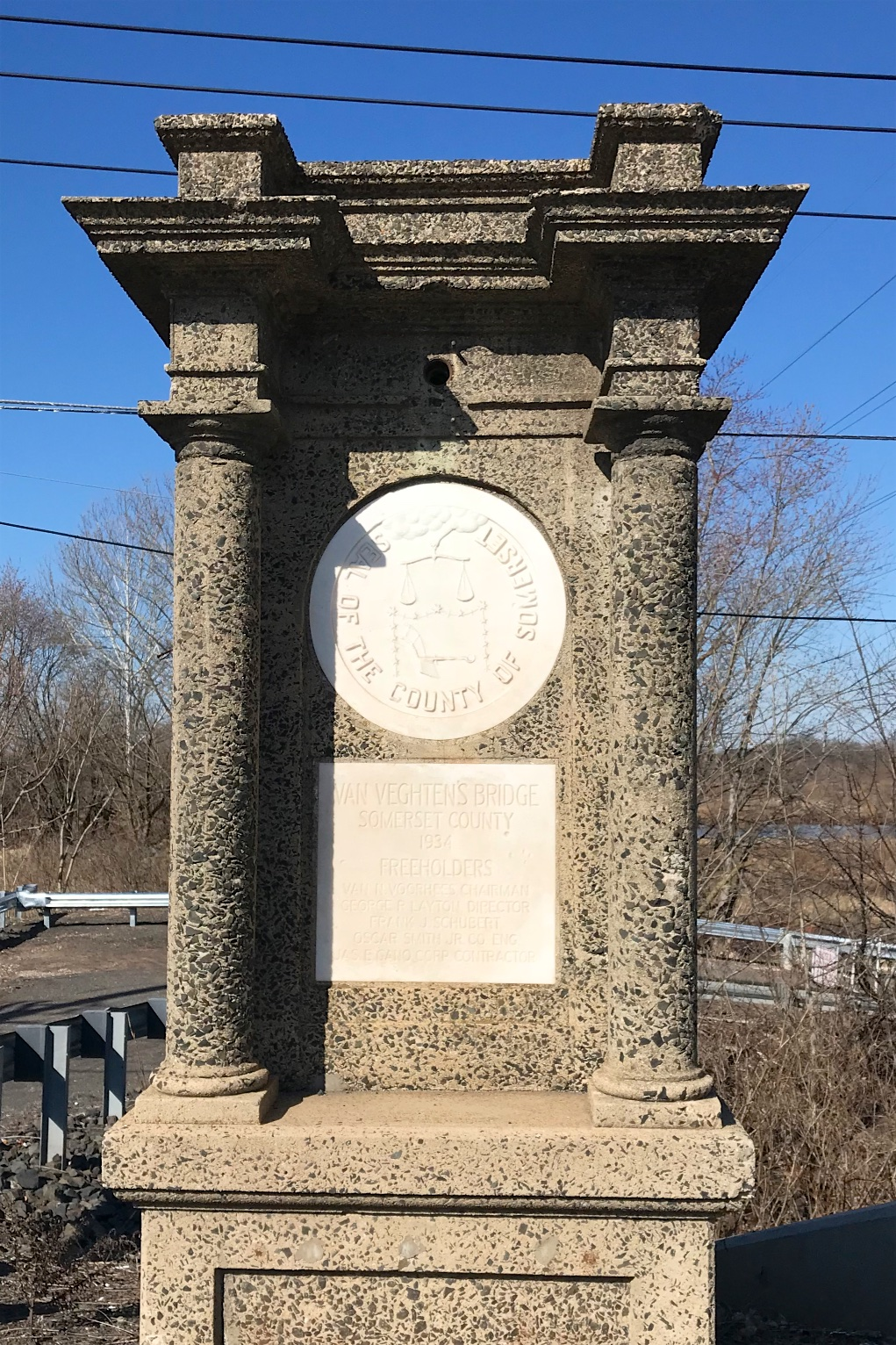
Van Veghten's Bridge, 1934 commemorative plaque

The current bridge was first built in 1896 using stone arches and a Pratt through truss for the main span. In 1934, the through truss was removed and replaced with a stringer bridge.

== See also ==
- List of crossings of the Raritan River
