= Jacobus Vanderveer House =

Historic house in New Jersey, United States

- U.S. National Register of Historic Places
- New Jersey Register of Historic Places
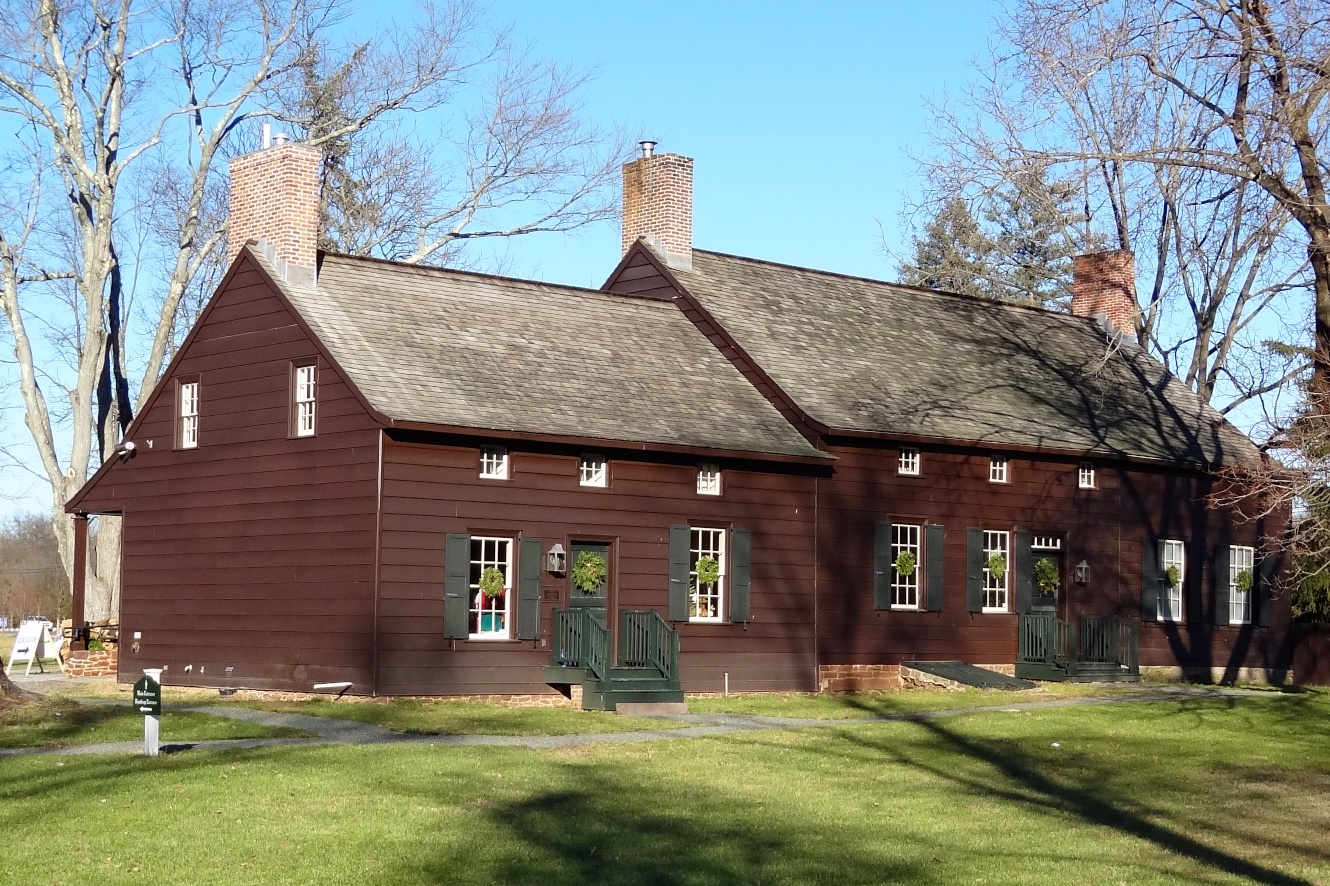

- Location within Somerset County, New Jersey Location within New Jersey Location within the United States
- Nearest city: Pluckemin, New Jersey
- Coordinates: 40°40′0″N 74°38′42″W
- Area: 19 acres (7.7 ha)
- Built: 1779
- Architectural style: Colonial, Federal
- NRHP reference No.: 95001137
- NJRHP No.: 2808

Significant dates
- Added to NRHP: September 29, 1995
- Designated NJRHP: July 13, 1995

The Jacobus Vanderveer House, also known as Knox House, is a U.S. Federal style house located just north of the community of Pluckemin in Bedminster Township, Somerset County, New Jersey at the junction of US 202 and 206 north of River Road. The house was added to the National Register of Historic Places on September 29, 1995, and noted as an "excellent example of a Dutch–American house". The Vanderveer /Knox House & Museum while owned by Bedminster Township, is operated under the direction of the Friends of the Jacobus Vanderveer House, a 501-C3 non-profit organization. The Jacobus Vanderveer House is situated on part of the 218 acres (0.88 km^{2}) that make up River Road Park. The house was thought to be built somewhere in the mid-1770s by James (Jacobus) Vanderveer, son to Jacobus Vanderveer after the property was willed to him by his father.

The house is notable as being the headquarters for General Henry Knox during the second Middlebrook encampment during the Revolutionary War (1778–79). Knox was in command of the Continental Army Artillery Cantonment, what is now known as America's first military training academy, the forerunner to the United States Military Academy at West Point. What was then known as the Pluckemin Continental Artillery Cantonment Site is near the Vanderveer/Knox house, which happens to be the only remaining original structure on the fringe of the cantonment.

Each year, the Jacobus Vanderveer House hosts a "colonial christmas" event to raise funds for the ongoing maintenance and preservation of the historic site. The event includes tree-lighting ceremony, traditional christmas decorations and other festivities.

== See also ==
Other houses used as headquarters during the second Middlebrook encampment (1778–79):

- Wallace House – General George Washington
- Van Veghten House – General Nathanael Greene
- Van Horne House – General William Alexander, Lord Stirling
- Staats House – General Friedrich Wilhelm von Steuben
