= Van Veghten House =

Historic house in New Jersey

- U.S. National Register of Historic Places
- New Jersey Register of Historic Places
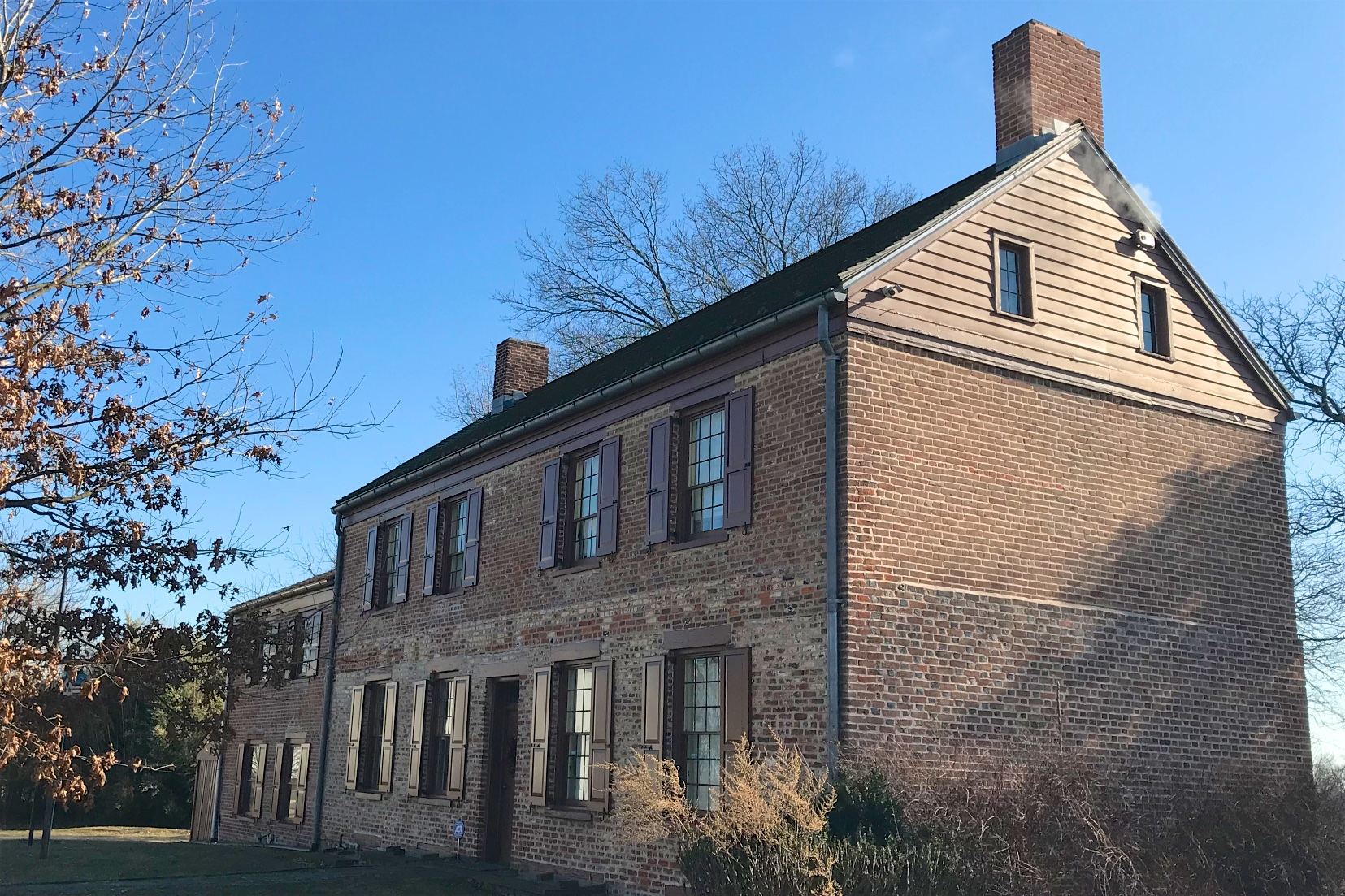
- Van Veghten House, looking east, 2018

- Location within Somerset County, New Jersey Location within New Jersey Location within the United States
- Location: 9 Van Veghten Drive; Bridgewater, New Jersey
- Coordinates: 40°33′25″N 74°35′18″W
- Area: 1 acre (0.40 ha)
- Built: c. 1725
- Architectural style: Greek Revival
- NRHP reference No.: 79003253
- NJRHP No.: 2487

Significant dates
- Added to NRHP: October 10, 1979
- Designated NJRHP: July 21, 1979

The Van Veghten House is a historic building in the Finderne section of Bridgewater Township, New Jersey. It was built around 1725 and served as the headquarters of Quartermaster General Nathanael Greene during the second Middlebrook encampment (1778–79) in the American Revolutionary War. The Somerset County Historical Society owns the house and uses it as its headquarters, including a museum and library. The early 18th-century Old York Road passed by here connecting Philadelphia to New York City. The house was added to the National Register of Historic Places on October 10, 1979 and noted as representing "one of the few remaining Raritan River mansions".

== History ==
In 1697, Michael Van Veghten (also spelled Van Vechten) purchased 834 acres along the Raritan River near Finderne. His first wife died and he married Jannetje Dumont on April 2, 1691. Their son Derrick inherited the property when Michael died in 1737.

During the second Middlebrook encampment, Derrick Van Veghten gave Quartermaster General Nathanael Greene and his wife Catharine Littlefield Greene the use of the house for his headquarters and the farm for an encampment of his troops, without asking for any compensation.

On March 19, 1779, General Greene described an event attended by General George Washington that was held at the Van Veghten House in a letter to Colonel Jeremiah Wadsworth:

a little dance at my quarters a few Evenings past. His Excellency and Mrs [Catharine] Greene danced upwards of three hours without once sitting down. Upon the whole we had a pretty little frisk.

— General Nathanael Greene

On August 30, 1781, the First Brigade of the French Army marched past his house, under the command of General Comte de Rochambeau, following the route to Yorktown, Virginia. The day's march was thirteen miles (21 km) from the campground at Bullion's Tavern in Liberty Corner to the campground at Somerset Courthouse, now Millstone, New Jersey. The Second Brigade followed on August 31. The American Continental Army marched nearby along different roads as part of this joint effort.

Derrick died in 1781 and the estate passed to his son Michael Van Veghten (1764–1831).

== Description ==
The house is two and a half stories plus a cellar. Brownstone is used for the foundation, and the first story features Flemish bond brickwork on the south and west walls; otherwise common bond brickwork is used. Iron beam anchors are visible on the south wall by the arches of brick voussoirs above the window heads. The house was renovated around 1837 in the style of Greek Revival and features four mantelpieces of that style.

== Gallery ==
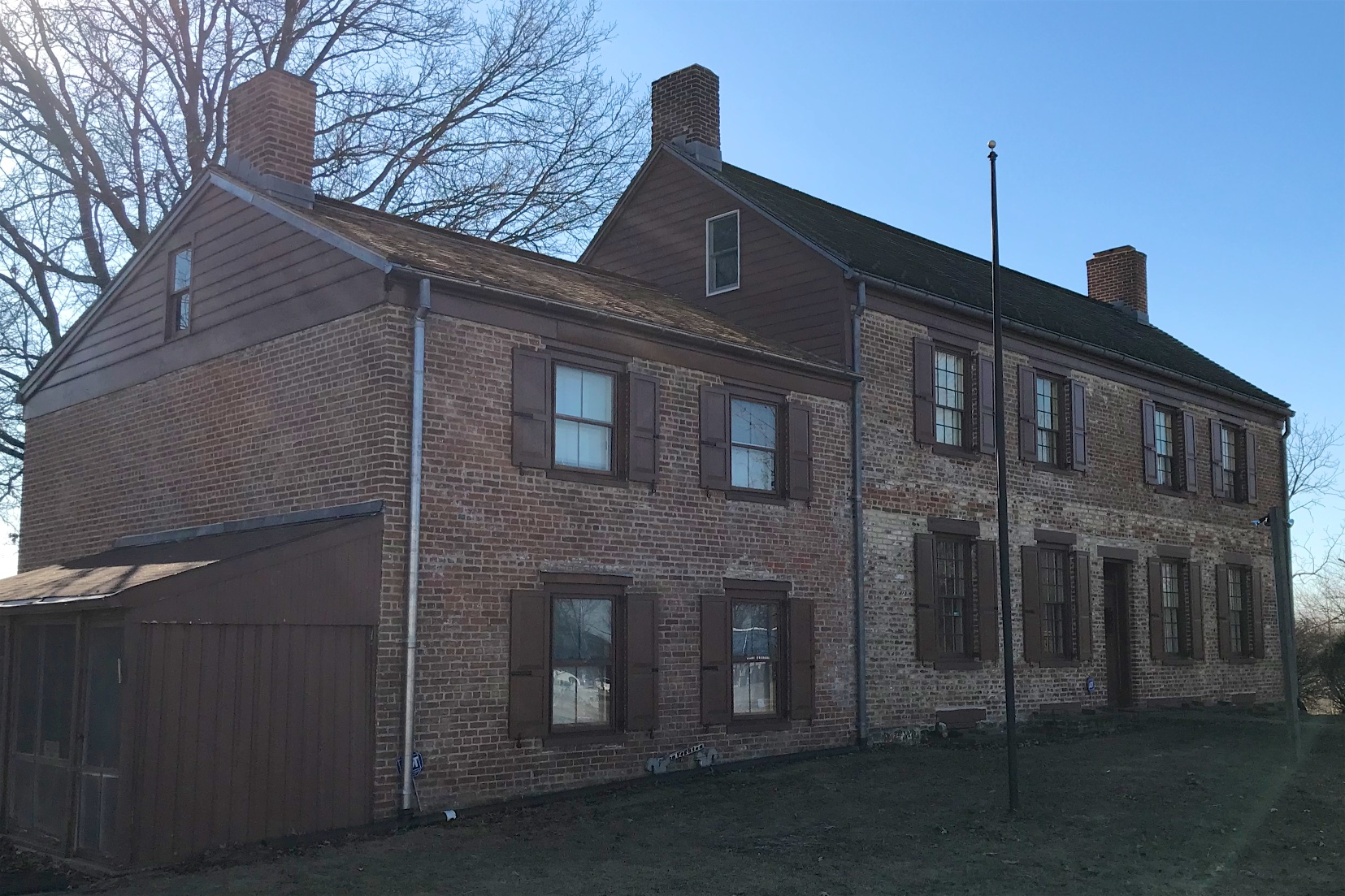
Van Veghten House, looking west

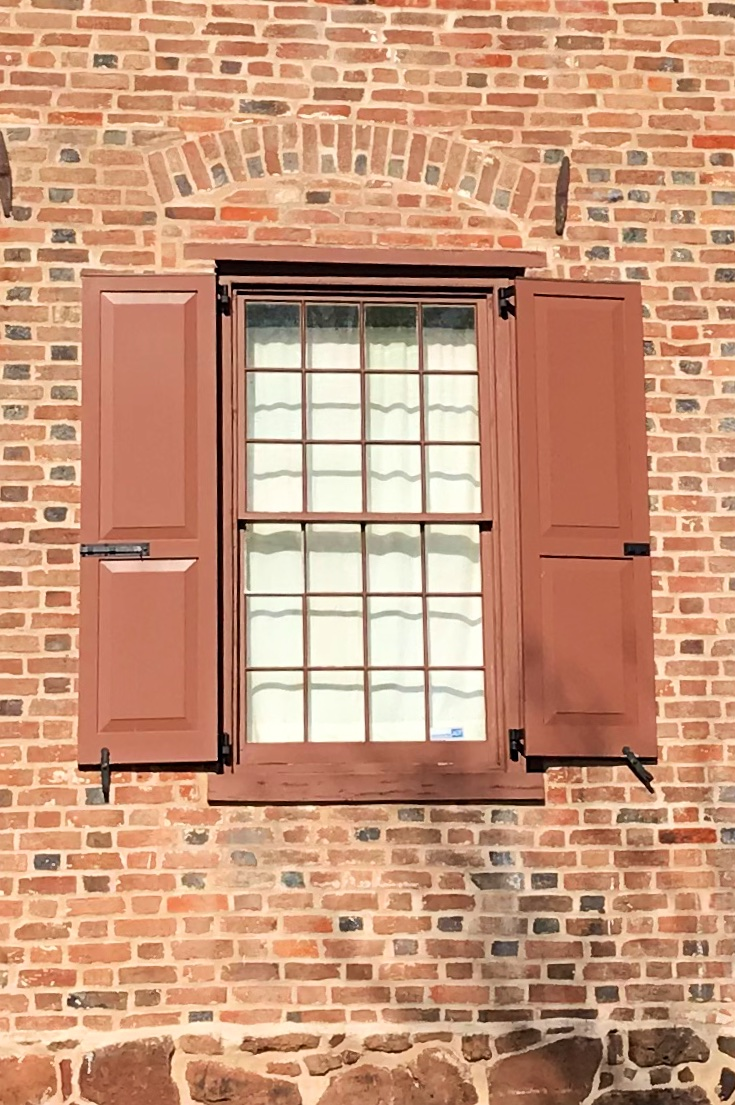
South wall Flemish bond brickwork, brownstone foundation, and iron beam anchors

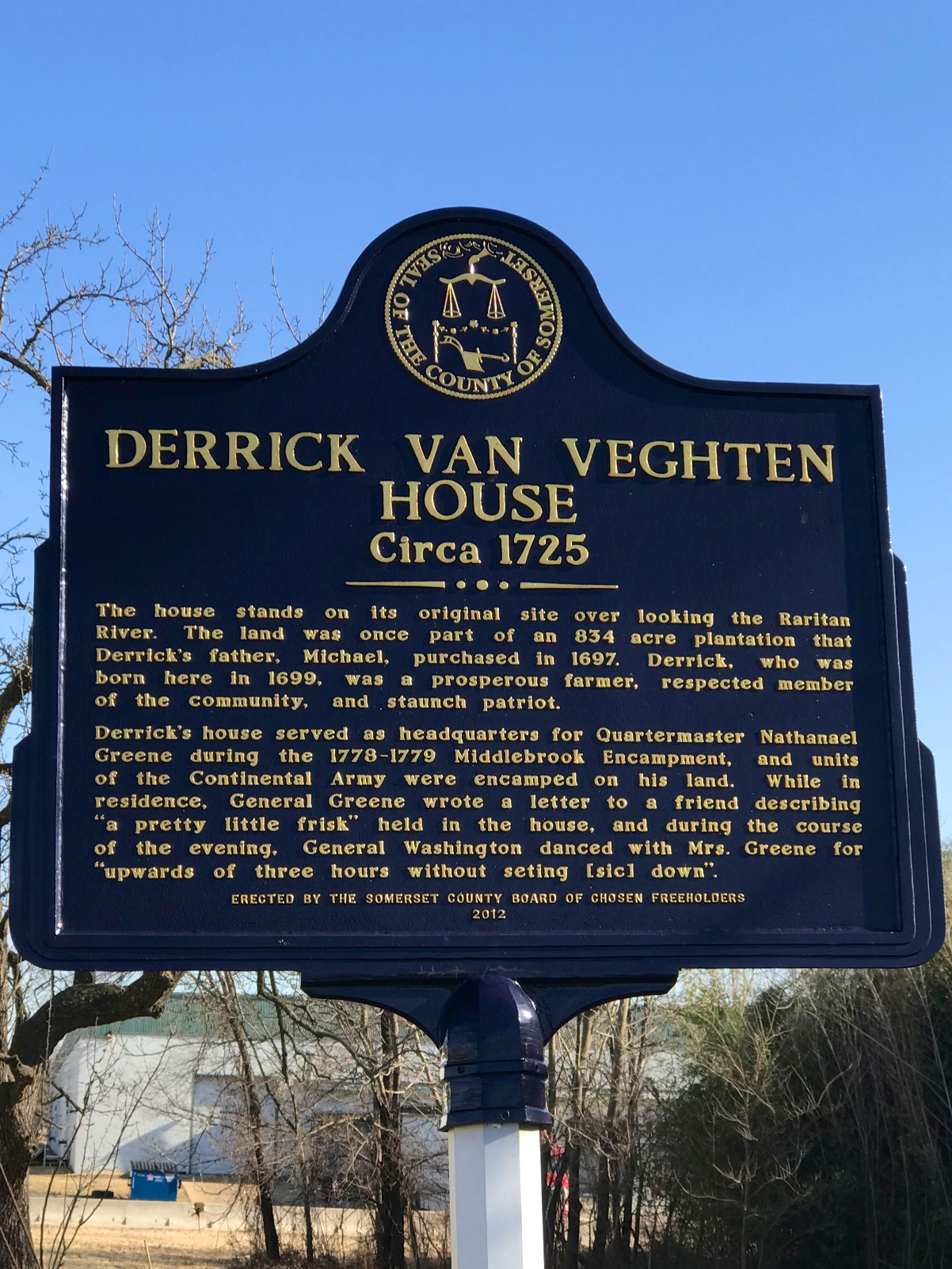
Somerset County historical information

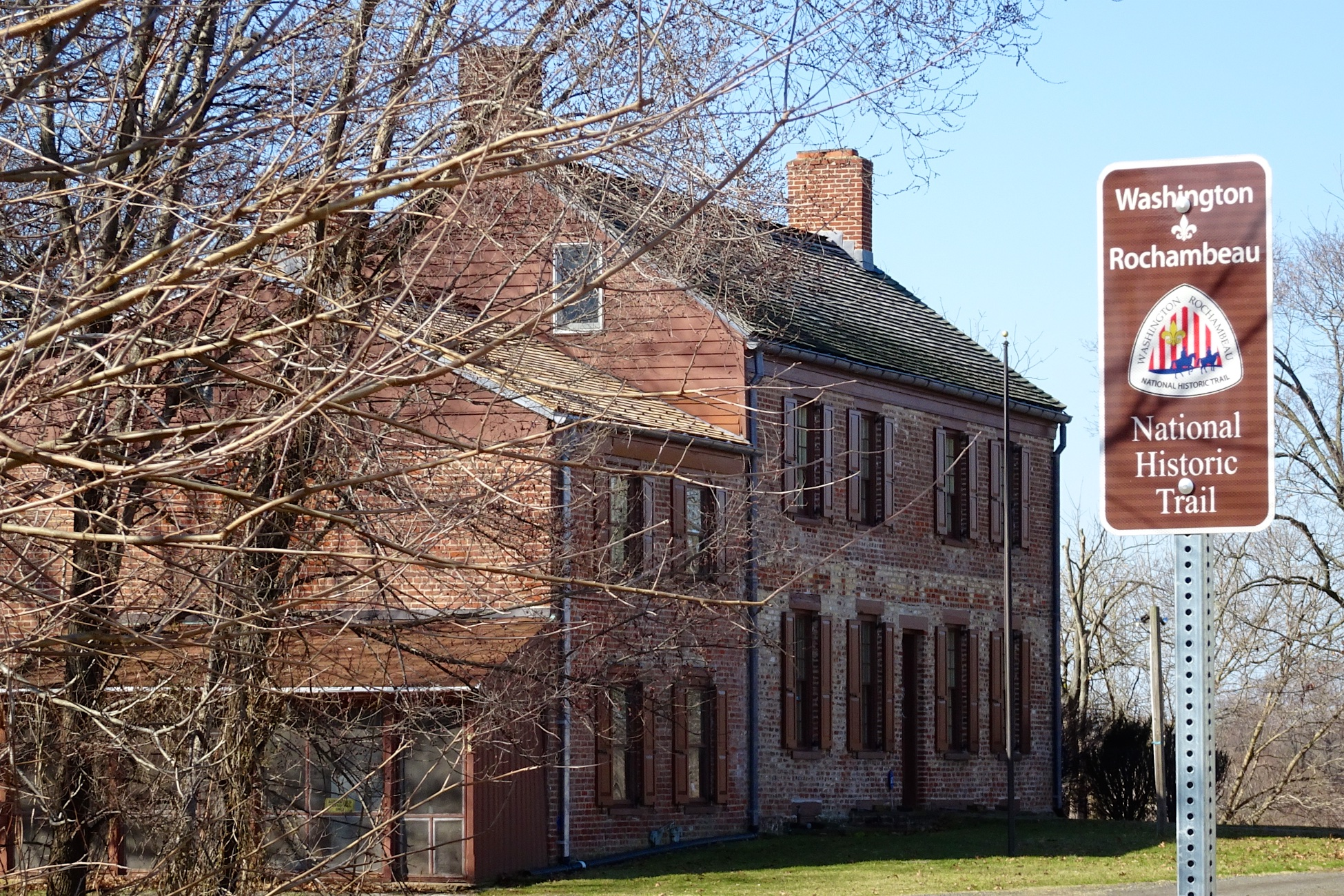
Washington-Rochambeau Revolutionary Route

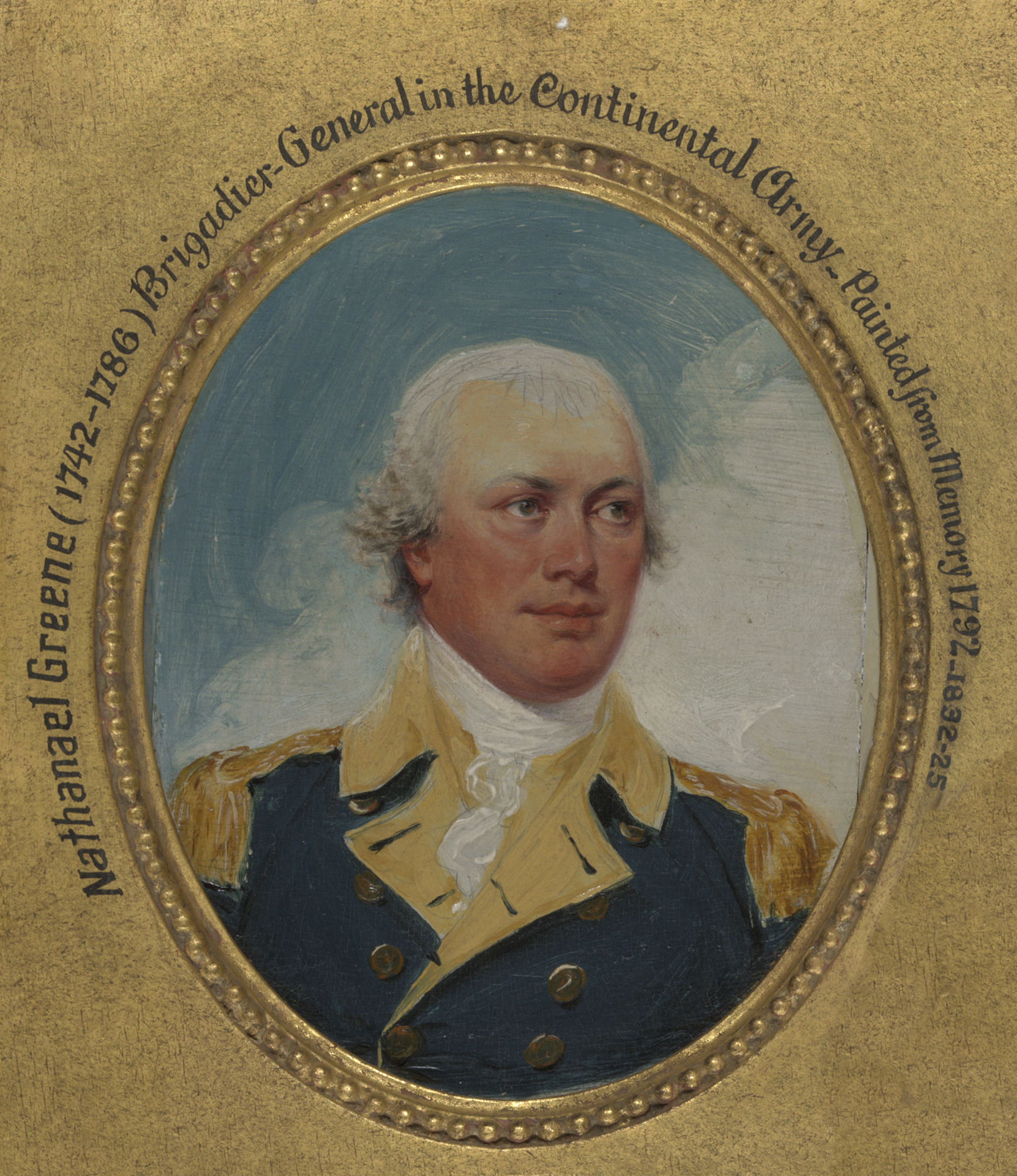
Nathanael Greene,
by John Trumbull, 1792

== See also ==
- Van Veghten's Bridge

Other houses used as headquarters during the second Middlebrook encampment (1778–79):

- Wallace House – General George Washington
- Van Horne House – General William Alexander, Lord Stirling
- Staats House – General Friedrich Wilhelm von Steuben
- Jacobus Vanderveer House – General Henry Knox
