= Middle Brook (Raritan River tributary) =

River in Somerset County, New Jersey

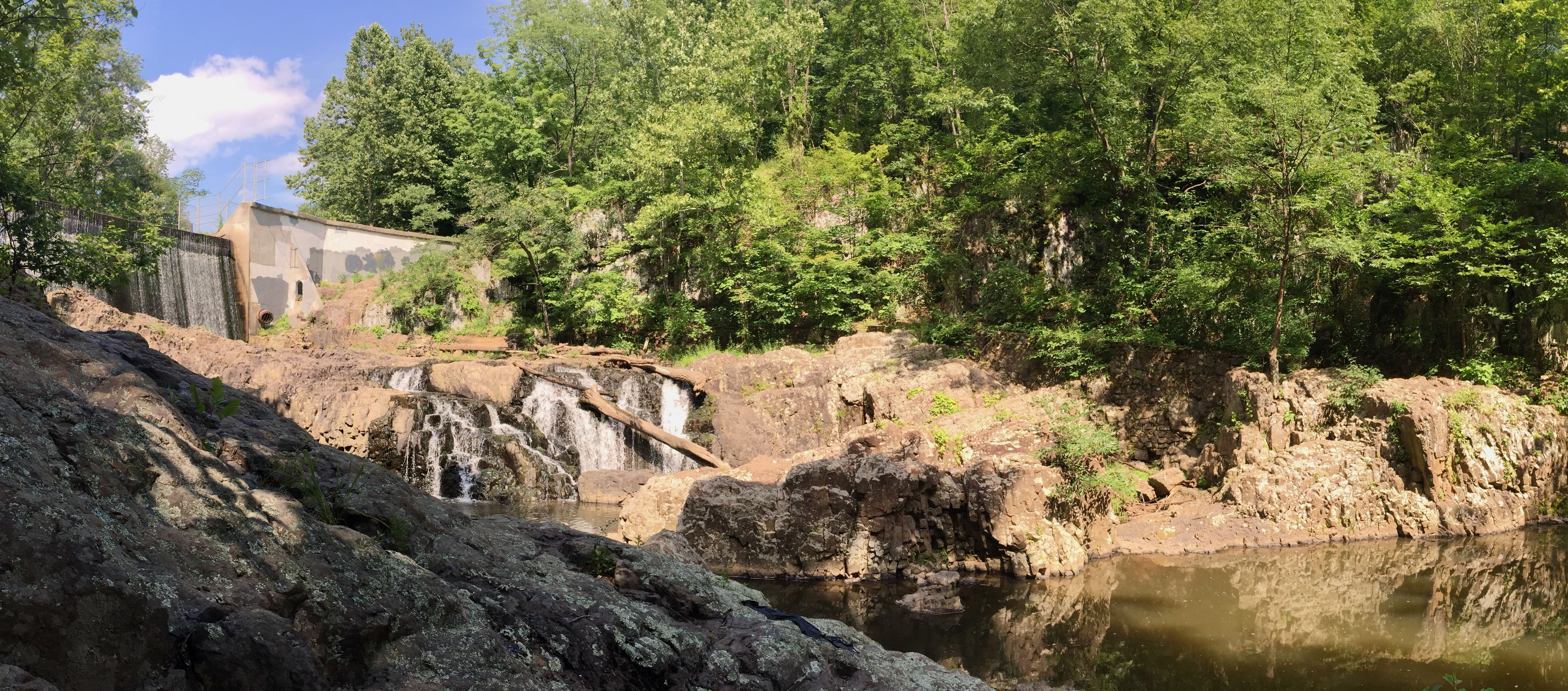
- Buttermilk Falls on the East Branch

- Location within Somerset County, New Jersey

Location
- Country: United States
- State: New Jersey
- County: Somerset County

Physical characteristics
- Mouth: Raritan River
  - location: Middlebrook
  - coordinates: 40°33′20″N 74°32′36″W

Basin features
- River system: Raritan River
- GNIS feature ID: 878292

Middle Brook is a tributary of the Raritan River in Somerset County, New Jersey. The stream can be referred to as Rha-weigh-weiros, a Native American name meaning "running from a deep hole", on early maps of the area.

== Washington Valley ==
The Middle Brook's western and eastern branches drain the valley, now known as Washington Valley, between the first and second Watchung Mountain ridges in Bridgewater Township and the western part of Warren Township. The two branches unite in the Bound Brook Gap and the Middle Brook runs southward where it enters the Raritan in Bound Brook. The total drainage area is 17.2 square miles (45 km^{2}). The Western Branch is followed by the Middle Brook Trail, a public hiking trail. In Washington Valley Park, the brook forms an artificial lake, the Washington Valley Reservoir. The smaller Eastern Branch is also dammed and then cascades over the Buttermilk Falls in Washington Valley Park.

== Flood control ==
The Middle Brook section in Bound Brook is being regulated as part of the Green Brook Flood Control Project in an attempt to spare Bound Brook flooding from backwater from the Raritan that can enter the terminal section of the Middle Brook.

== See also ==
- List of rivers of New Jersey
- Middlebrook encampment
