= Middlebrook encampment =

- Middlebrook Encampment Site
- U.S. National Register of Historic Places
- New Jersey Register of Historic Places
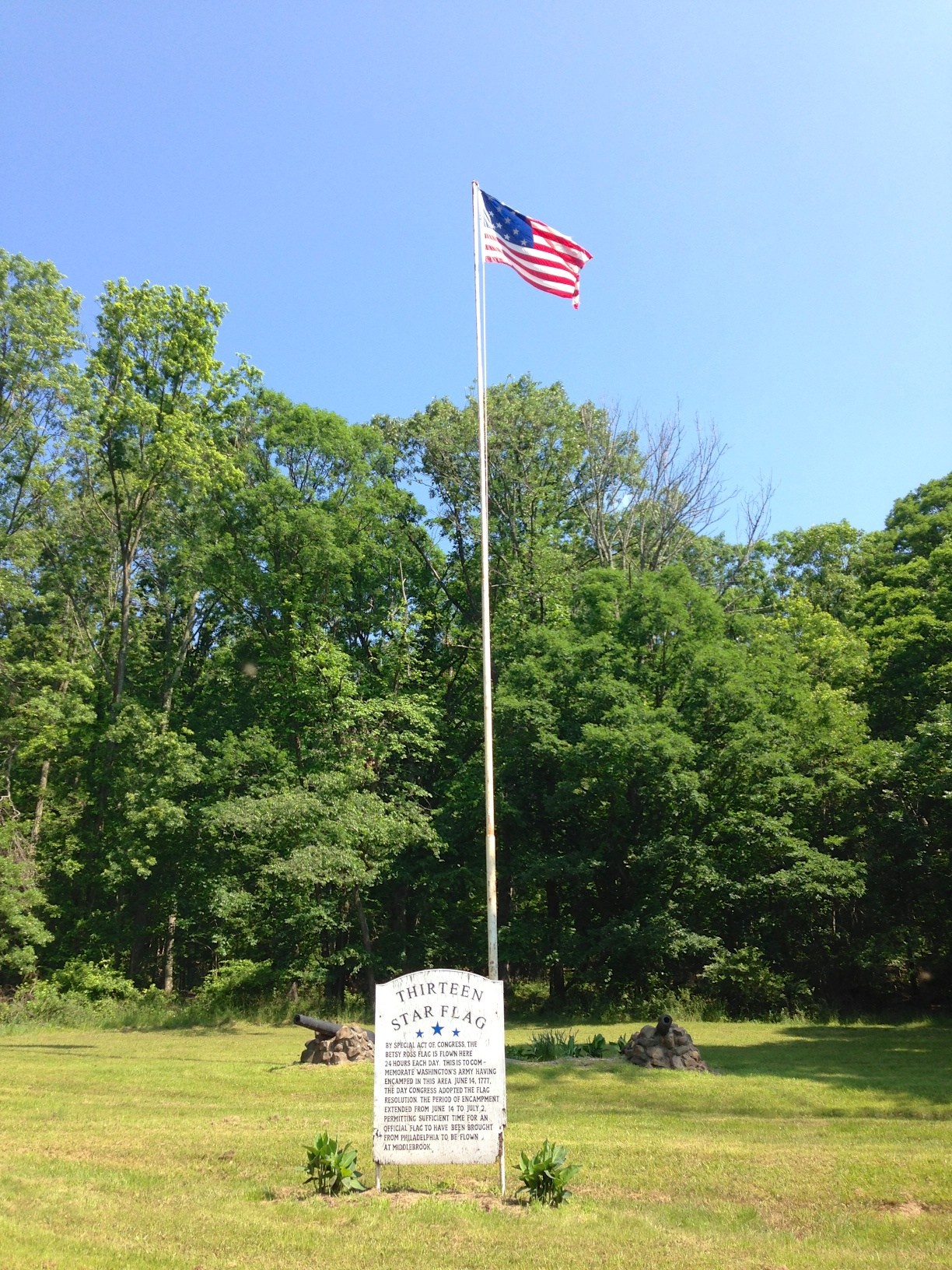
- A Thirteen Star Flag at the Middlebrook encampment is displayed continuously.

- Location within Somerset County, New Jersey Location within New Jersey Location within the United States
- Location: Middlebrook Road, Bridgewater Township, New Jersey
- Coordinates: 40°34′45″N 74°32′16″W
- NRHP reference No.: 75001160
- NJRHP No.: 2485

Significant dates
- Added to NRHP: July 3, 1975
- Designated NJRHP: May 8, 1975

The First Middlebrook encampment refers to the spring encampment of the Continental Army, commanded by General George Washington, during the American War for Independence near the Middle Brook in Bridgewater Township, New Jersey (between Martinsville and Bound Brook) in 1777. The second, longer winter cantonment took place in 1778–1779, from December 1 to mid-June. A cantonment is a protracted quartering of an army in a specific location, typically for the duration of the winter.

A portion of the first encampment site, known as the Washington Camp Ground, was added to the National Register of Historic Places on July 3, 1975. The Campground is located in Martinsville, a section of Bridgewater Township. The Middlebrook Encampment site includes part of the ridge of the First Watchung Mountain. Its position provided a natural fortress not only protecting the Continental Army but also overlooking the plains towards New Brunswick, where the British forces were stationed in 1777. A surviving earthen redoubt believed to date to the 1777 encampment is also located on the mountain within Washington Valley Park. The strategic strength of the army's position on the Watchung or Blue Mountain ridge contributed ultimately to the success of the Continental Army by lengthening the war and wearying the British forces during both of the army's stays.

== First Middlebrook or the Spring Encampment (1777) ==
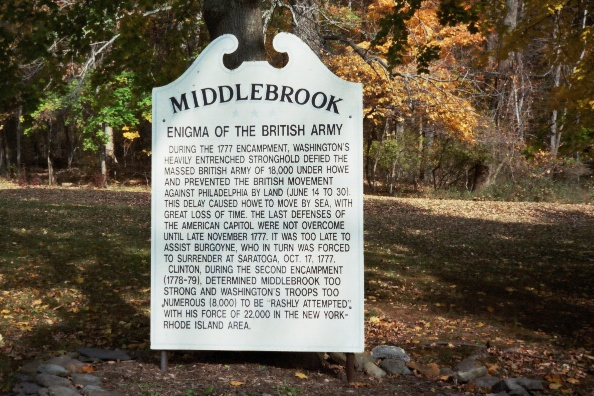
Enigma of the British Army

During the winter of 1776–1777, Washington initially encamped the Continental Army at Morristown, New Jersey. After his outpost garrison at Bound Brook was surprised and routed during the Battle of Bound Brook on April 13, 1777, Washington moved the encampment closer to Bound Brook. The army established its Middlebrook encampment on May 28 and stayed there until July 2. A total of 8,298 soldiers were housed in the encampment, but 2,660 of them were sick or disabled, unable to fight. In contrast, the British maintained a force of about 17,000 near New Brunswick, New Jersey. From the heights of the Watchung Mountains, Washington could monitor and counteract British movements. When General Howe decided to move against Philadelphia, concern over the threat by the Continental Army made him choose the safer sea route instead of the faster land route. This led to a significant delay in operations for the British and disrupted plans to reinforce British General Burgoyne in northern New York. On June 30, Howe moved his troops to Staten Island in preparation for his Philadelphia campaign, and two days later Washington left Middlebrook and moved the army to Pompton Plains, New Jersey.

== First flag: June 1777 ==
It is largely conceded that it was at the Middlebrook encampment that the first official flag of the United States was unfurled, after a law to adopt a national flag had been passed by Congress on June 14, 1777. This event is commemorated annually since 1889 on July 4 with a changing of the flag, a reading of the Declaration of Independence, and the delivery of an historical address at the Washington Camp Ground. Also, by special order of Congress, a Thirteen Star Flag is flown 24 hours a day at the Washington Camp Ground.

== Second Middlebrook or the Middlebrook Cantonment (1778–1779) ==
Washington used the area around Middlebrook and much of central Somerset County as a cantonment site, known as the Middlebrook Cantonment, during the winter of 1778–1779. He brought about 8,000–10,000 troops to the area between November 30, 1778 and late January, 1779, arriving himself in early December. The main cantonment stretched across a broad swatch of Somerset County including sites in present-day South Bound Brook, the Finderne section of Bridgewater, Somerville, and. Raritan, as well as Pluckemin to the north. Smaller contingents of troops were cantoned at Elizabethtown, Minisink, the New York Highlands, and Danbury, Connecticut. In each of their separate camps at Middlebrook, soldiers constructed cabins from logs covered with clay, but improving on the construction, layout, and organization compared to the previous winter at Valley Forge. The hutting constructed at Pluckemin for the artillery camp was more elaborate. Washington himself rented the Wallace House (now a New Jersey State Historic site) in Somerville for six months to serve as "Headquarters Middlebrook" and paid Wallace $1,000 for this inconvenience. General von Steuben lived at the Staats House in South Bound Brook. General Henry Knox lived at the Jacobus Vanderveer House near Pluckemin with the Continental Artillery encamped at the Pluckemin Artillery Cantonment Site. on the hills above Pluckemin. Nathanael Greene lived at the Van Veghten House in Finderne. General William Alexander, Lord Stirling, and on occasion, General Richard Henry Lee, occupied the Philip Van Horne House in Bridgewater. All five headquarters are publicly owned National Register sites. The main body of the much larger British army was based in New York that winter. Washington again used the security of the Watchung heights to monitor their troop movements and maintain a strong defensive position. The cantonment ended on June 3, 1779 when Washington led his army north to Highlands, New York and General John Sullivan began the 1779 summer campaign against the Iroquois Nation.

== Today ==
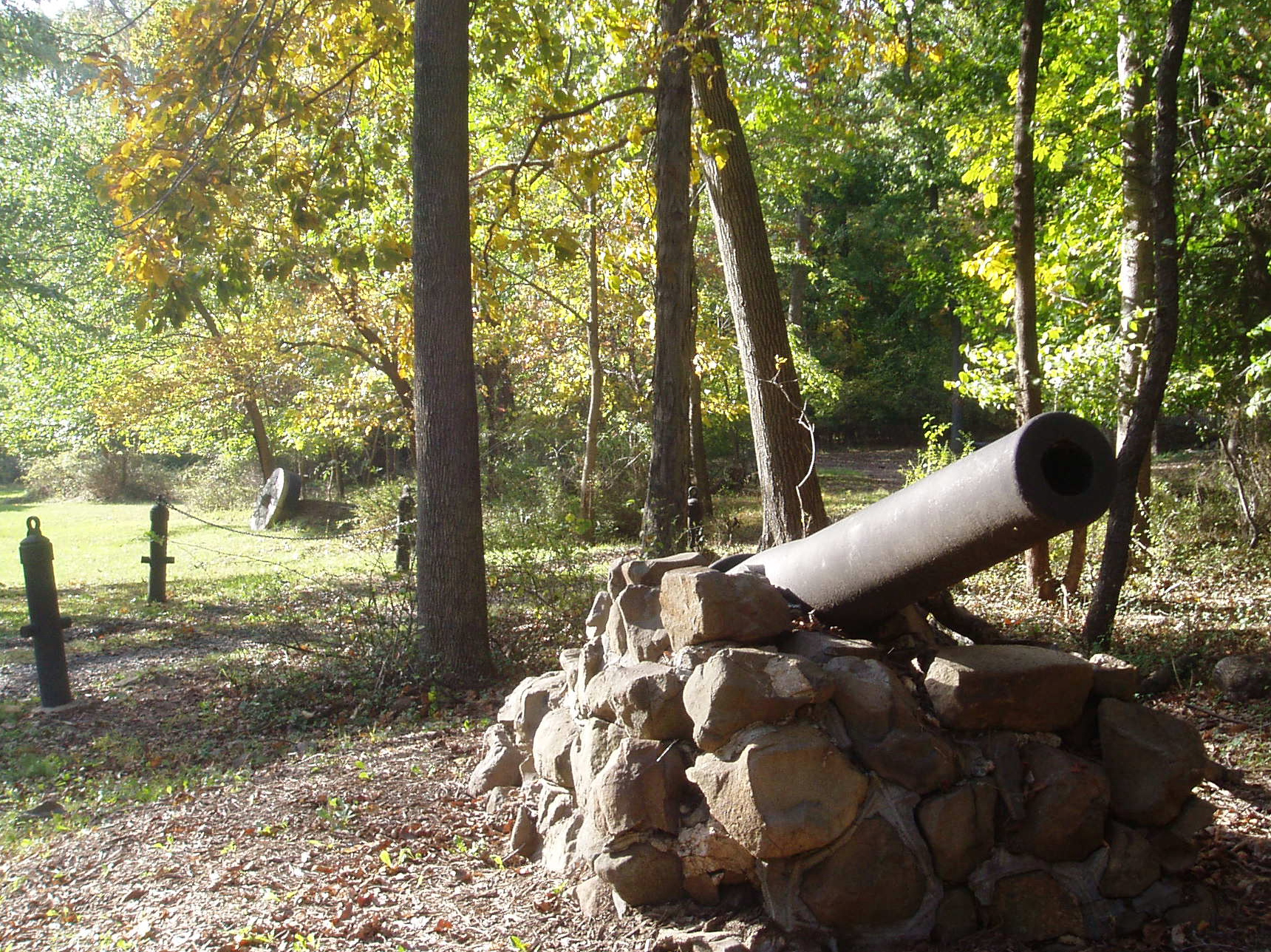
Entrance to Washington Camp Ground, Middlebrook encampment

The Washington Camp Ground, on Middlebrook Road in Bridgewater Township, just north of Route 22, was deemed a historic site by local citizens in 1889, and entered the National Register of Historic Places July 3, 1975. The site is owned and preserved by the Camp Ground Association Washington Camp Ground Association, which also organizes the annual July 4 program at the site. The program includes a public reading of the complete Declaration of Independence, which has been read at the site each July 4 for more than 100 years.

Various other sites related to the Middlebrook encampment are accessible to the public. These include Washington Rock State Park, an observation site on top of the Watchung mountain ridge, in Green Brook, Washington Valley Park in Bridgewater (nearby, but separate from, the Washington Camp Ground). A sign commemorating the encampment also stands in a now-developed area, at the corner of Chimney Rock and Gilbride Roads in Bridgewater. All five colonial homes that served as headquarters to the Generals during the cantonment were preserved at various times by local organizations beginning in 1898 with the Wallace House and all are now National Register Sites open to the public. See their respective websites for further information. A driving tour of the Middlebrook Cantonment area is available from the Heritage Trail Association and a "Five Generals Tour" is organized by Heritage Trail with the cooperating sites of the Middlebrook Cantonment.

== See also ==
Headquarters during the second Middlebrook encampment
- Battle of Bound Brook
- Pluckemin Continental Artillery Cantonment Site

Nearby houses used as headquarters during the second Middlebrook encampment:

- Wallace House – General George Washington
- Van Veghten House – General Nathanael Greene
- Van Horne House – General William Alexander, Lord Stirling
- Staats House – General Friedrich Wilhelm von Steuben
- Jacobus Vanderveer House – General Henry Knox
