= Old Dutch Parsonage =

Historic house in New Jersey, United States

- U.S. National Register of Historic Places
- New Jersey Register of Historic Places
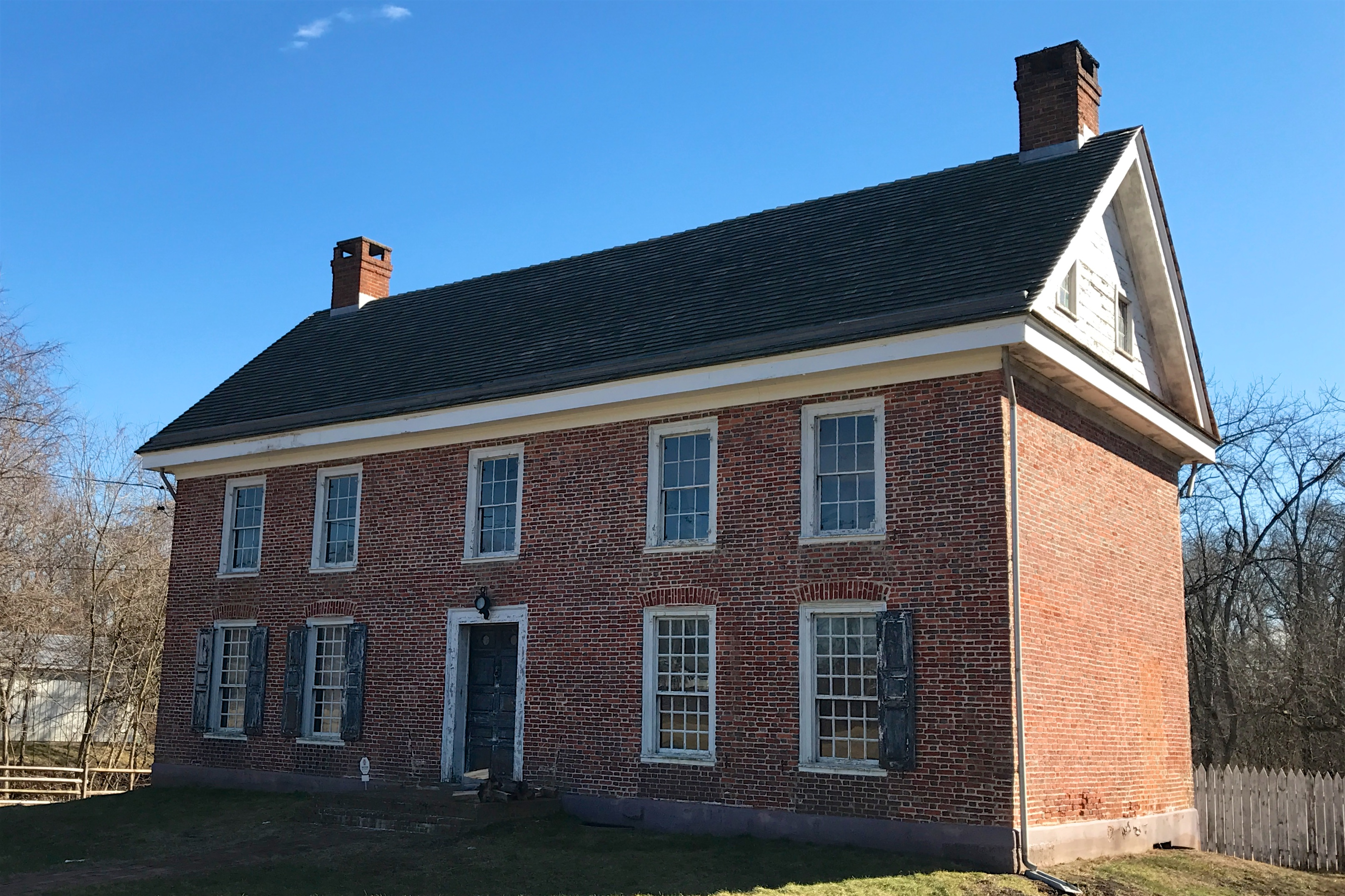
- Old Dutch Parsonage, 2017

- Location within Somerset County, New Jersey Location within New Jersey Location within the United States
- Location: 65 Washington Place, Somerville, New Jersey, United States
- Coordinates: 40°34′5″N 74°37′23″W
- Built: 1751
- NRHP reference No.: 71000514
- NJRHP No.: 2581

Significant dates
- Added to NRHP: January 25, 1971
- Designated NJRHP: September 11, 1970

The Old Dutch Parsonage is a historic house built in 1751, moved about 1913 and now located at 65 Washington Place, in the borough of Somerville in Somerset County, New Jersey, United States. It was added to the National Register of Historic Places on January 25, 1971, for its significance in education and religion. The nomination form notes it as "an excellent example of mid-18th-century Flemish bond brick structure".

== History ==
The 2 1/2-story brick house was the home of the first ministers of the first Dutch Reformed Churches in the area, built by the combined efforts of the congregations in Somerville, New Jersey, and Raritan, New Jersey, in 1751.

The first occupant was Reverend John Frelinghuysen who taught seminarians in the house. His son Frederick Frelinghuysen was a captain in the Continental Army. Jacob Rutsen Hardenbergh, one of the seminarians who occupied the house after Frelinghuysen's death along with the former reverend's widow and her children, succeeded Frelinghuysen as minister, occupant of the house, and, in 1756, as husband to the former Mrs. Frelinghuysen.

Hardenbergh helped establish Queen's College, now known as Rutgers University, in 1766 and in 1785 became its first president. He moved from the house in 1781, but it continued in use as a parsonage until 1810.

Peter Stryker bought the house in 1810 and sold it to the Doughty family in 1836. They owned it until 1907 when they sold it to the Central Railroad of New Jersey.

In 1913, the house was set to be knocked down by the railroad, but instead it was moved adjacent to the Wallace House, which was built in 1775.

== Notable burials ==
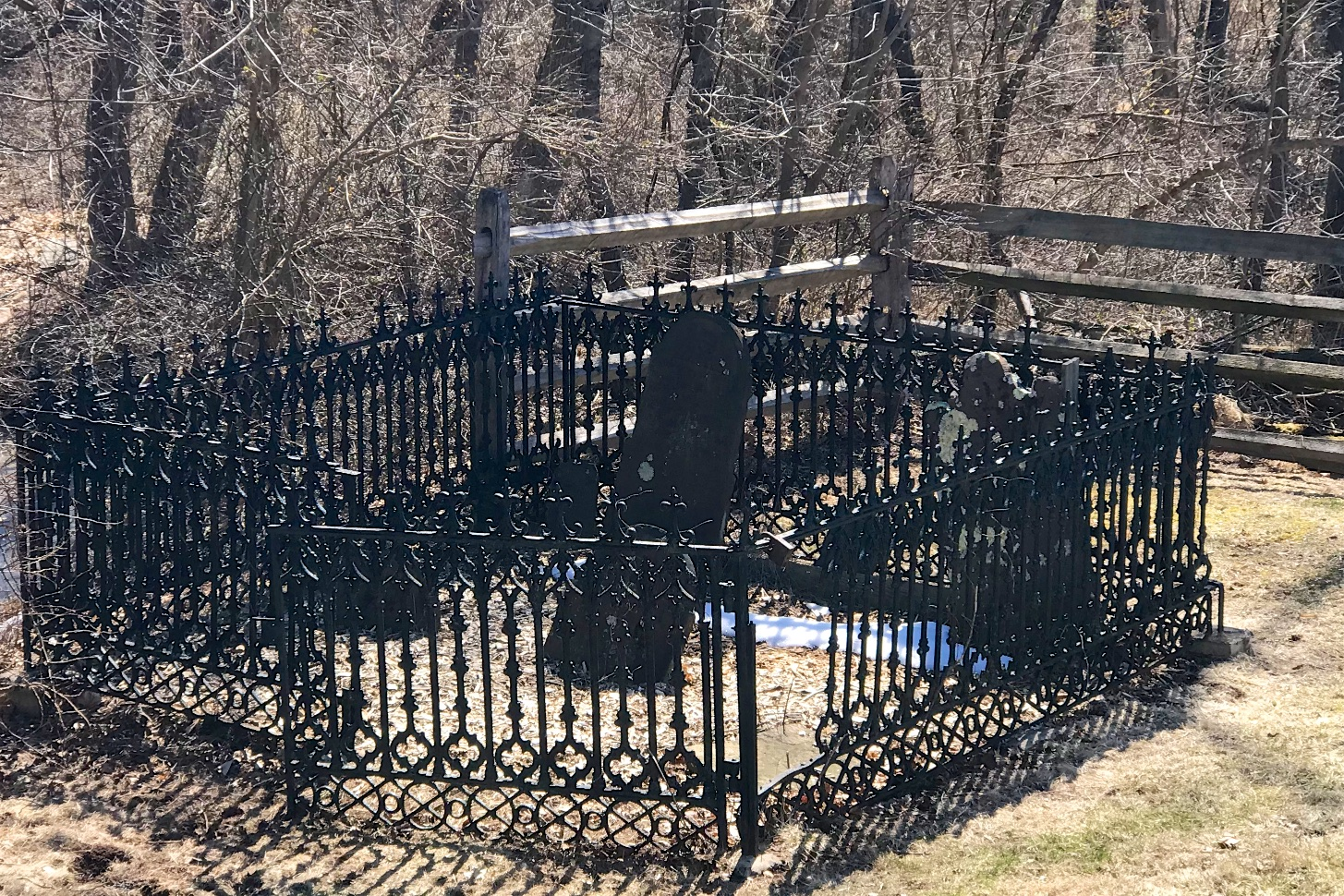
Old Dutch Parsonage Burial Ground

The Old Dutch Parsonage Burial Ground located behind the house contains early-18th-century graves.

Harmanus Barkeloo II (1745–1788) and John Waldron (1737–1790) are buried in the cemetery.

== See also ==
- National Register of Historic Places listings in Somerset County, New Jersey
- List of museums in New Jersey
