= Middlebrook, New Jersey =

Populated place in Somerset County, New Jersey, US

- Unincorporated community
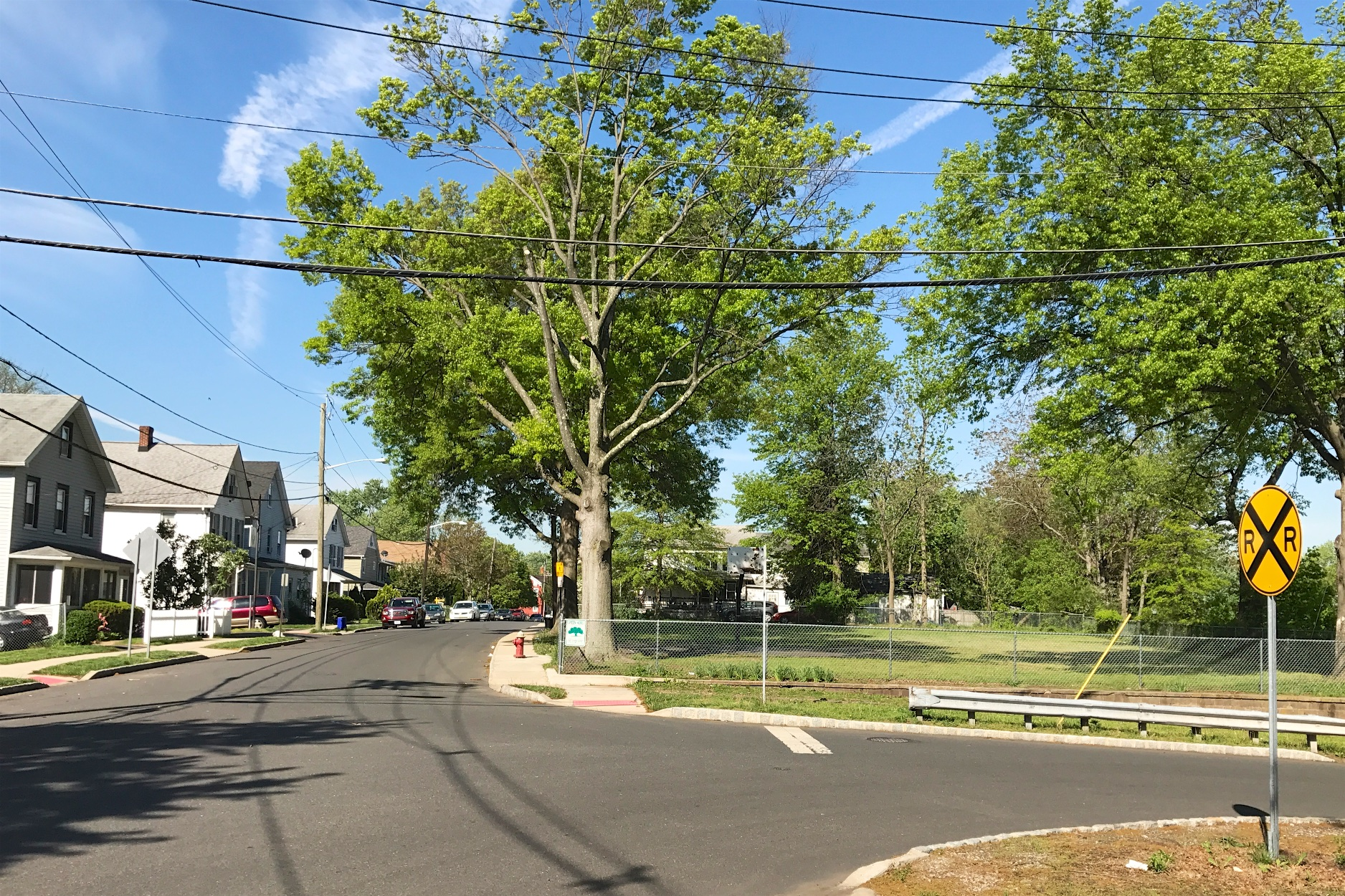
- West Main Street and Vosseller Avenue, Middlebrook section of Bound Brook, site of the Middlebrook Hotel, in 2017

- Location within Somerset County, New Jersey Location within New Jersey Location within the United States
- Coordinates: 40°33′36″N 74°32′24″W
- Country: United States
- State: New Jersey
- County: Somerset
- Borough: Bound Brook
- Named for: Middle Brook (Raritan River tributary)

Middlebrook is an unincorporated community within the borough of Bound Brook in Somerset County, in the U.S. state of New Jersey. It is named after the Middle Brook, a tributary of the Raritan River, on the western side of the community. The early-18th-century Old York Road, connecting Philadelphia to New York City, passed through here.

== History ==
On May 4, 1681, a group of investors purchased from two Raritans, Konackama and Queromak, land bounded by the Raritan River, the Bound Brook, and the Middle Brook to the mountains for one hundred pounds, paid in goods. On September 25, 1683, Thomas Codrington, one of the original group, was apportioned 877 acres of this tract and built a house here, which he called Rackawackhana.

After the Battle of Bound Brook on April 13, 1777, General George Washington moved the Continental Army from its winter encampment at Morristown to the Middle Brook valley between the First and Second Watchung Mountains, now called Washington Valley, protected by positions on the Middlebrook Heights, the First Watchung ridge north of Middlebrook. This first Middlebrook encampment lasted from May 28 to July 2, 1777.

== Historic houses ==
The Harris Tavern, built 1700 at the intersection of West Main Street and Vosseller Avenue, was the first hotel in Bound Brook. During the American Revolutionary War, it was known as the Middlebrook Hotel and was a favorite of army officers. Later it was known as the Fisher Hotel. The building has since been demolished.

The Thomas Codrington house, built 1683 at the intersection of High Street and LaMonte Avenue, was the first house built in Somerset County.

== Notable people ==
People who were born in, residents of, or otherwise closely associated with Middlebrook include:

- Tunis Campbell (1812–1891), successful black politician in the Reconstruction era

== Gallery ==
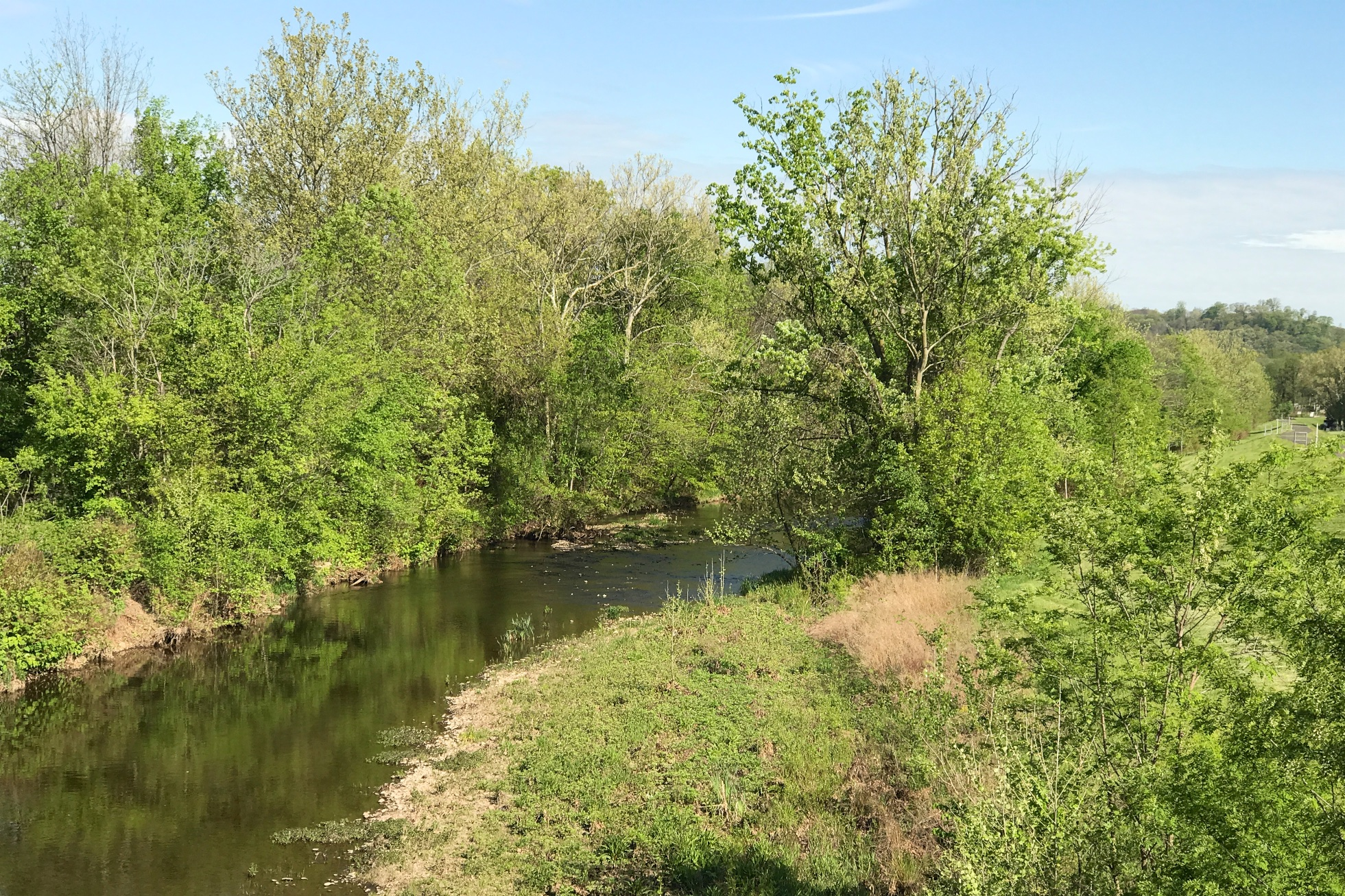
The namesake Middle Brook, on the western side of Middlebrook

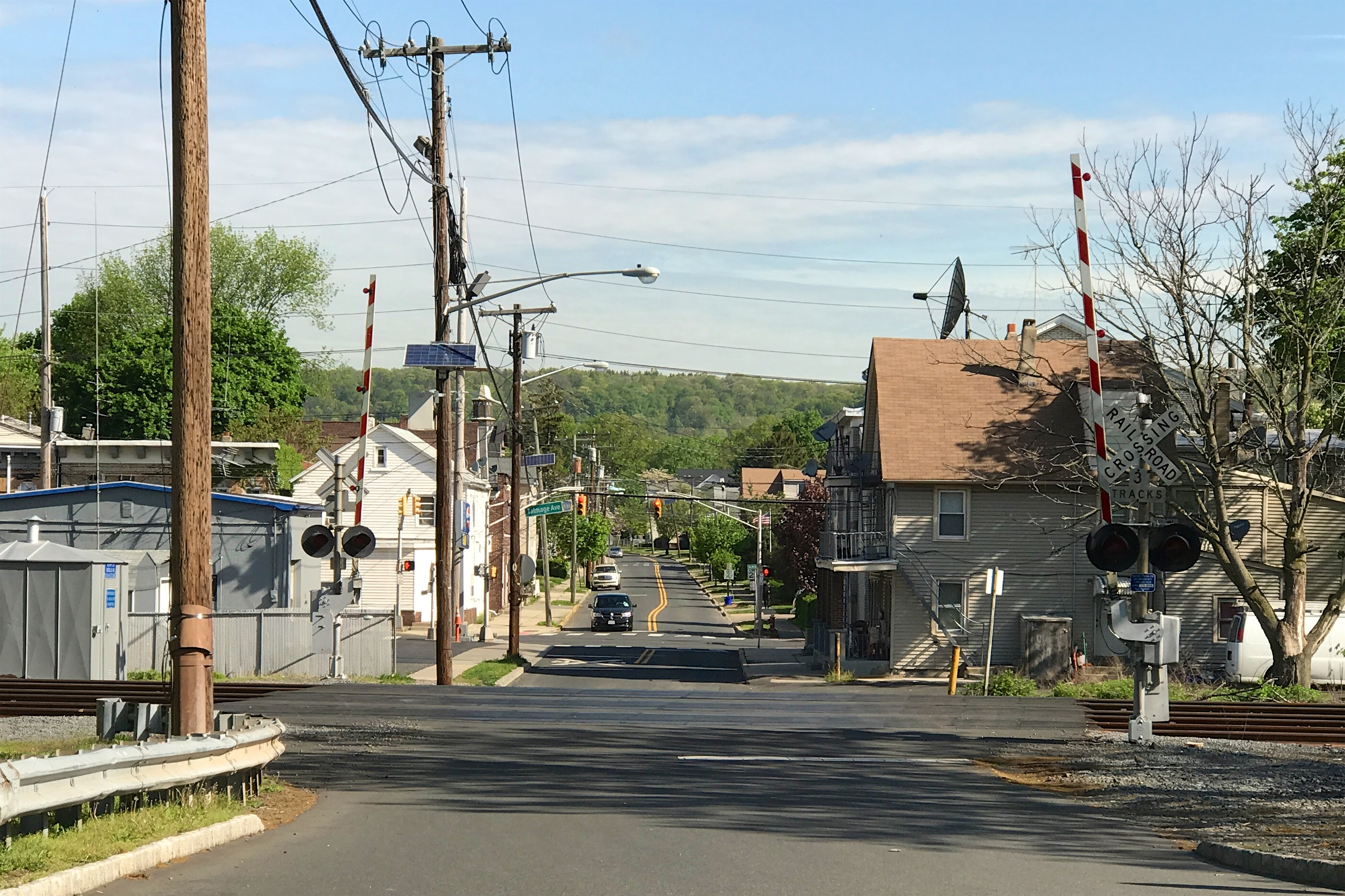
Looking north toward the Middlebrook Heights along Vosseller Avenue from West Main Street

== Bibliography ==
- Davis, T. E. (February 22, 1893). First Houses of Bound Brook. Bound Brook, N.J.: Washington Camp Ground Association. OCLC 866449373.
- Snell, James P., ed. (1881). History of Hunterdon and Somerset Counties, New Jersey. Philadelphia: Everts & Peck.
