= The Story of an Old Farm =

1889 book by Andrew Mellick

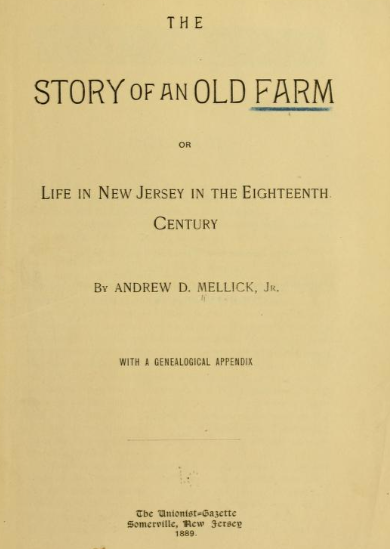
- Title page for The Story of an Old Farm (1889)
- Author: Andrew D. Mellick Jr
- Language: English
- Genre: Non-fiction
- Publisher: The Unionist-Gazette
- Publication date: 1889
- Publication place: United States

The Story of an Old Farm, or Life in New Jersey in the Eighteenth Century, with a Genealogical Appendix was an 1889 book by American historian Andrew D. Mellick Jr., of Somerville, New Jersey. It was published by The Unionist-Gazette.

== Description ==
Mellick draws from family and other hitherto unpublished papers many pictures of social life to tell a story of the manners and customs and the political history of the Colonial and Revolutionary periods in East New Jersey. The chapters devoted to the early German emigration to the American colonies, and the causes which had so much to do with this people in seeking new homes, are explained. There are also earnest words in behalf of the German contingent of the British army during the American War of Independence.

The genealogy contains a full record of the Moelich-Malick-Melick-Mellick family, following five ancestral lines from five different emigrants, and in addition is given the posterity of Jacob Kline and Richard Field, of Hunterdon County, N. J., and Simon Himrod and Bethnel Vincent, of Northumberland County, Pennsylvania. The closing pages of the book are devoted to a comprehensive bibliography and a very complete index.

== Origins of the book ==
In southern New Mexico, Mellick had a difference of opinion with a Comanche pony, and as a result was unable to stand, walk, or write. To beguile the pains and tedium of his hours on a lounge, he betook himself to the writing of this book. The work was undertaken at a time when his sufferings were great, and his opportunities of composition so casual as to make the employment of a regular amanuensis impracticable. The chance services of friends and the members of his family were all that he could command. The following passage from a letter of Mellick gives an idea of the patience brought to bear in the discharge of his task:

During the entire time the writing of this book was under way, no visits could be made to localities, libraries, the rooms of historical societies, or to individuals. Information not obtained from books was only to be had by extensive and prolonged correspondence, necessitating the dictating of over two thousand letters. In addition, not only did the body of the work grow by dictation, but the copious notes, covering two thousand folio pages, made from reading the books enumerated in the bibliography in the appendix, were preserved in like manner.
