= Finderne, New Jersey =

Populated place in Somerset County, New Jersey, US

- Census-designated place
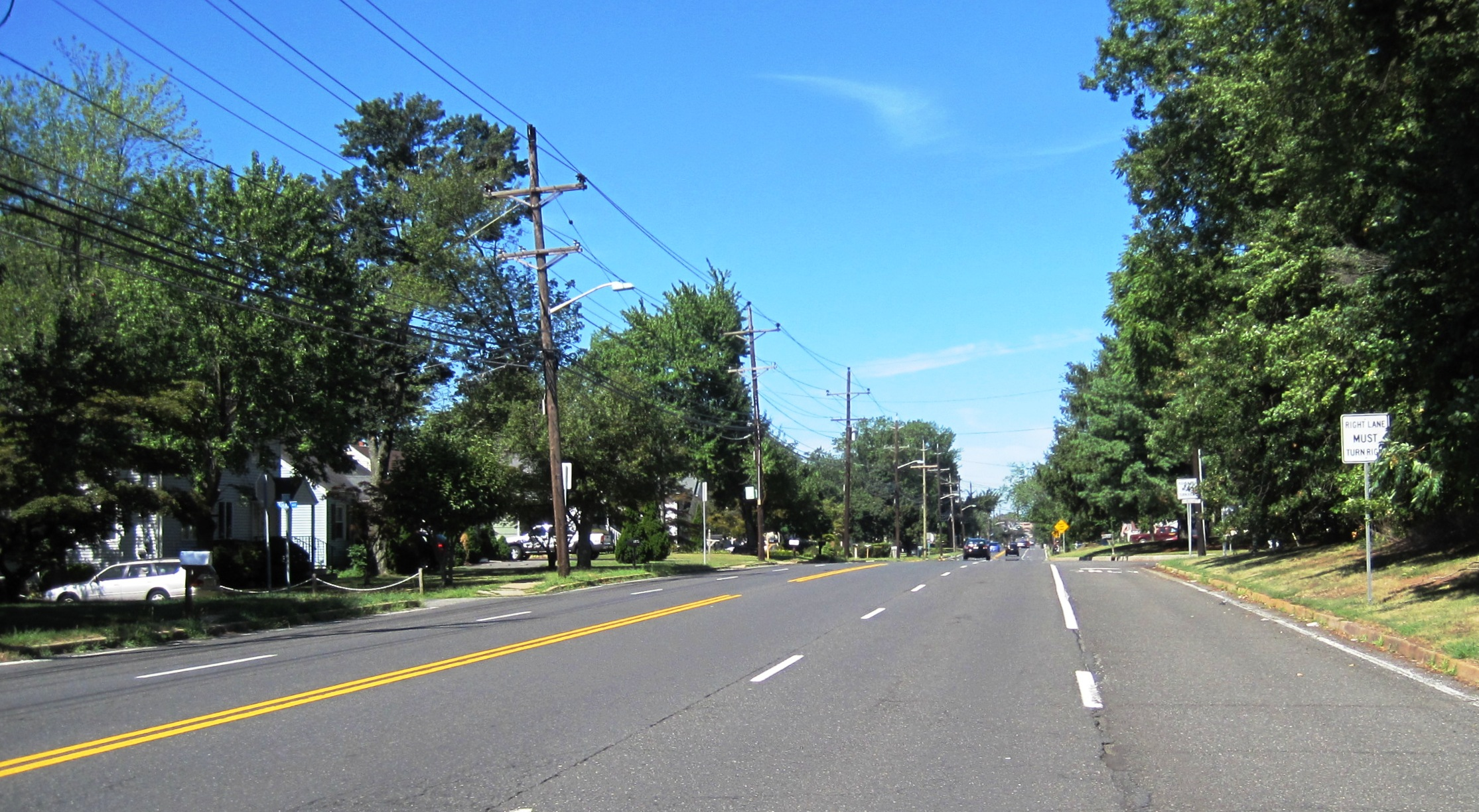
- Along East Main Street (CR 612)

- Location in Somerset County Location in New Jersey Location in the United States
- Coordinates: 40.561278°N 74.574237°W
- Country: United States
- State: New Jersey
- County: Somerset
- Township: Bridgewater

Area
  - Total: 4.33 sq mi (11.21 km^{2})
  - Land: 4.09 sq mi (10.60 km^{2})
  - Water: 0.24 sq mi (0.62 km^{2}) 5.56%
- Elevation: 82 ft (25 m)

Population (2020)
  - Total: 6,392
  - Density: 1,562.5/sq mi (603.3/km^{2})
- Time zone: UTC−05:00 (Eastern (EST))
  - Summer (DST): UTC−04:00 (Eastern (EDT))
- ZIP Code: 08876 - Somerville
- Area code: 908
- FIPS code: 34-23310
- GNIS feature ID: 02583988

Finderne is an unincorporated community and census-designated place (CDP) located within Bridgewater Township, in Somerset County, in the U.S. state of New Jersey. As of the 2020 census, Finderne had a population of 6,392.

Located in southeastern Bridgewater between Bound Brook and Somerville, Finderne is a diverse area with older neighborhoods bordering Foothill Road, newer developments, multi-unit housing near the Raritan River/Manville border, as well as commercial and industrial areas. The Middlebrook Crossing industrial park, the Promenade shopping center and TD Bank Ballpark, home to the Somerset Patriots, are located here.

== Geography ==
According to the United States Census Bureau, Finderne had a total area of 4.336 square miles (11.232 km^{2}), including 4.095 square miles (10.607 km^{2}) of land and 0.241 square miles (0.625 km^{2}) of water (5.56%).

== Demographics ==
Historical population
Census	Pop.	Note	%±
2010	5,600		—
2020	6,392		14.1%
U.S. Decennial Census; 2010 2020

Finderne first appeared as a census designated place in the 2010 U.S. census.

=== Racial and ethnic composition ===
Finderne CDP, New Jersey – Racial and ethnic composition Note: the US Census treats Hispanic/Latino as an ethnic category. This table excludes Latinos from the racial categories and assigns them to a separate category. Hispanics/Latinos may be of any race.
Race / Ethnicity (NH = Non-Hispanic)	Pop 2010	Pop 2020	% 2010	% 2020
White alone (NH)	3,201	2,853	57.16%	44.63%
Black or African American alone (NH)	285	313	5.09%	4.90%
Native American or Alaska Native alone (NH)	10	8	0.18%	0.13%
Asian alone (NH)	825	1,394	14.73%	21.81%
Native Hawaiian or Pacific Islander alone (NH)	0	1	0.00%	0.02%
Other race alone (NH)	27	54	0.48%	0.84%
Mixed race or Multiracial (NH)	74	138	1.32%	2.16%
Hispanic or Latino (any race)	1,178	1,631	21.04%	25.52%
Total	5,600	6,392	100.00%	100.00%

=== 2020 census ===
As of the 2020 census, Finderne had a population of 6,392. The median age was 38.9 years. 23.0% of residents were under the age of 18 and 15.6% of residents were 65 years of age or older. For every 100 females there were 93.6 males, and for every 100 females age 18 and over there were 92.9 males age 18 and over.

100.0% of residents lived in urban areas, while 0.0% lived in rural areas.

There were 2,155 households in Finderne, of which 38.7% had children under the age of 18 living in them. Of all households, 54.4% were married-couple households, 17.1% were households with a male householder and no spouse or partner present, and 22.6% were households with a female householder and no spouse or partner present. About 21.9% of all households were made up of individuals and 8.4% had someone living alone who was 65 years of age or older.

There were 2,327 housing units, of which 7.4% were vacant. The homeowner vacancy rate was 2.0% and the rental vacancy rate was 10.4%.

=== 2010 census ===
The 2010 United States census counted 5,600 people, 2,147 households, and 1,327 families in the CDP. The population density was 1,367.4 per square mile (528.0/km^{2}). There were 2,324 housing units at an average density of 567.5 per square mile (219.1/km^{2}). The racial makeup was 70.86% (3,968) White, 5.61% (314) Black or African American, 0.29% (16) Native American, 14.77% (827) Asian, 0.00% (0) Pacific Islander, 5.93% (332) from other races, and 2.55% (143) from two or more races. Hispanic or Latino of any race were 21.04% (1,178) of the population.

Of the 2,147 households, 29.5% had children under the age of 18; 45.8% were married couples living together; 11.6% had a female householder with no husband present and 38.2% were non-families. Of all households, 30.9% were made up of individuals and 14.3% had someone living alone who was 65 years of age or older. The average household size was 2.54 and the average family size was 3.19.

20.7% of the population were under the age of 18, 7.1% from 18 to 24, 30.4% from 25 to 44, 25.1% from 45 to 64, and 16.6% who were 65 years of age or older. The median age was 39.4 years. For every 100 females, the population had 88.9 males. For every 100 females ages 18 and older there were 86.2 males.

== Points of interest ==
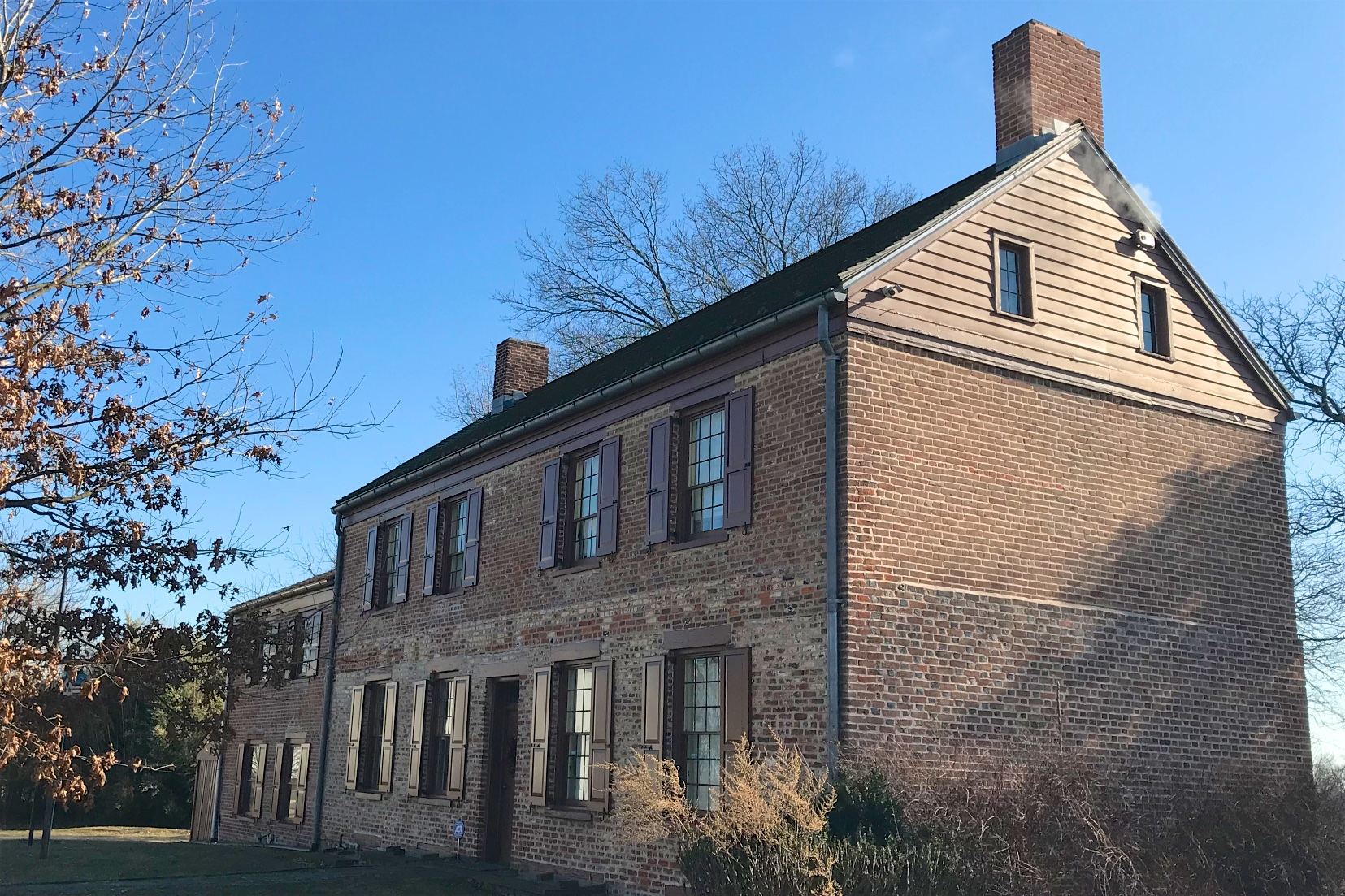
Van Veghten House, 2018

The Van Veghten House was built c. 1725 and served as the headquarters of Quartermaster General Nathanael Greene during the second Middlebrook encampment (winter of 1778–79) of the American Revolutionary War. The house was added to the National Register of Historic Places in 1979, and noted as representing "one of the few remaining Raritan River mansions".
