= Wallace House (Somerville, New Jersey) =

Historic house in New Jersey, United States

- U.S. National Register of Historic Places
- New Jersey Register of Historic Places
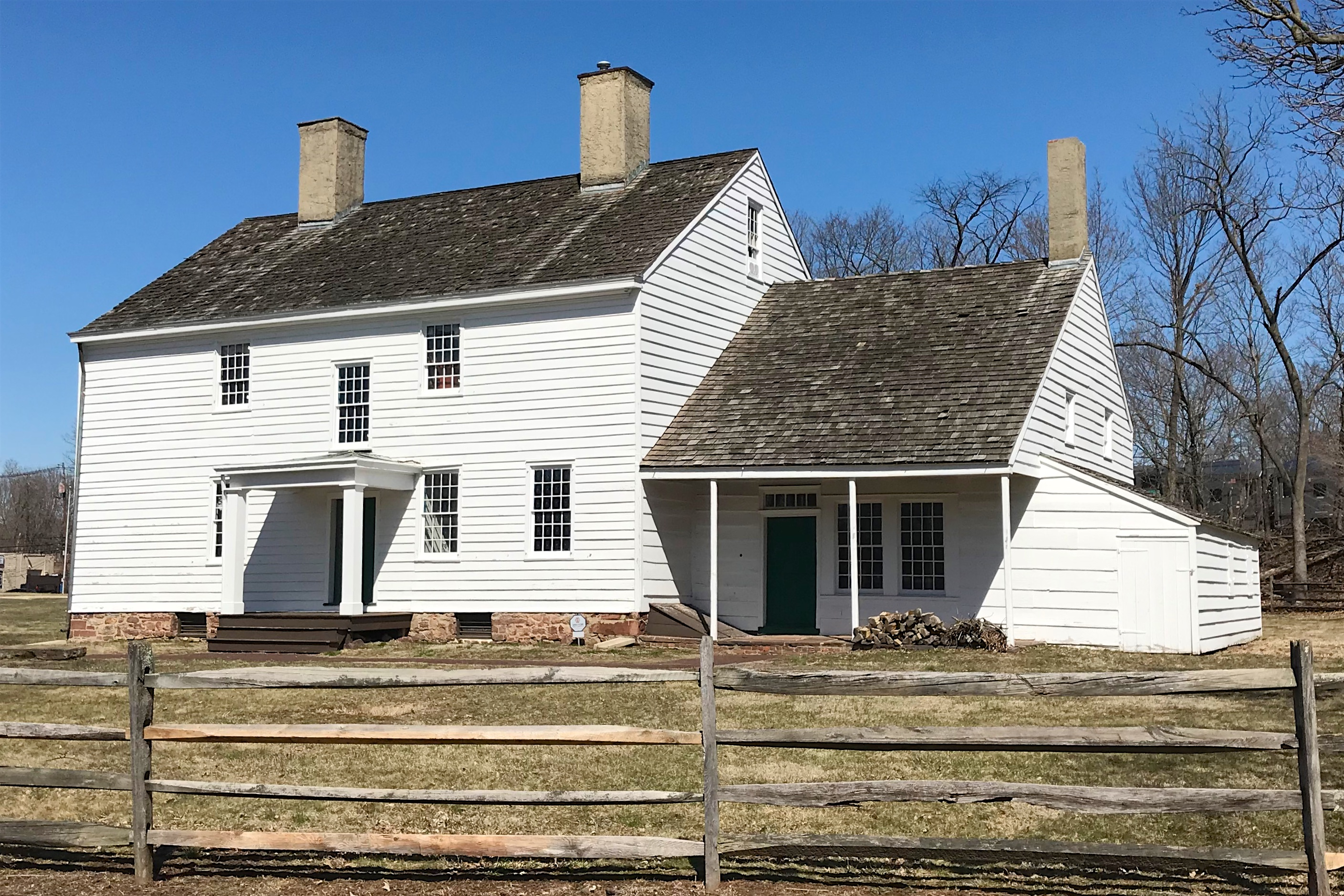
- Wallace House, 2018

- Location within Somerset County, New Jersey Location within New Jersey Location within the United States
- Location: 38 Washington Place; Parking: 71 Somerset Street; Somerville, New Jersey
- Coordinates: 40°34′8″N 74°37′19″W
- Area: 1.5 acres (0.61 ha)
- Built: 1776
- NRHP reference No.: 70000395
- NJRHP No.: 2584

Significant dates
- Added to NRHP: December 2, 1970
- Designated NJRHP: September 11, 1970

The Wallace House is a Georgian style historic house, which served as the headquarters of General George Washington during the second Middlebrook encampment (1778–79), located at 38 Washington Place, Somerville, Somerset County, New Jersey, United States. It was added to the National Register of Historic Places on December 2, 1970.

== History ==
Jacob Rutsen Hardenbergh, a Dutch Reformed minister who lived in the nearby Old Dutch Parsonage, sold a small farmhouse and 95 acres (38 ha) of land to John Wallace, who was a merchant and fabric importer in Philadelphia. In 1775 and 1776, Wallace bought 12 acres (4.9 ha) more land, and in 1776 built an eight-room Georgian mansion next to the farmhouse. Wallace named the estate "Hope Farm," and planned to retire there.

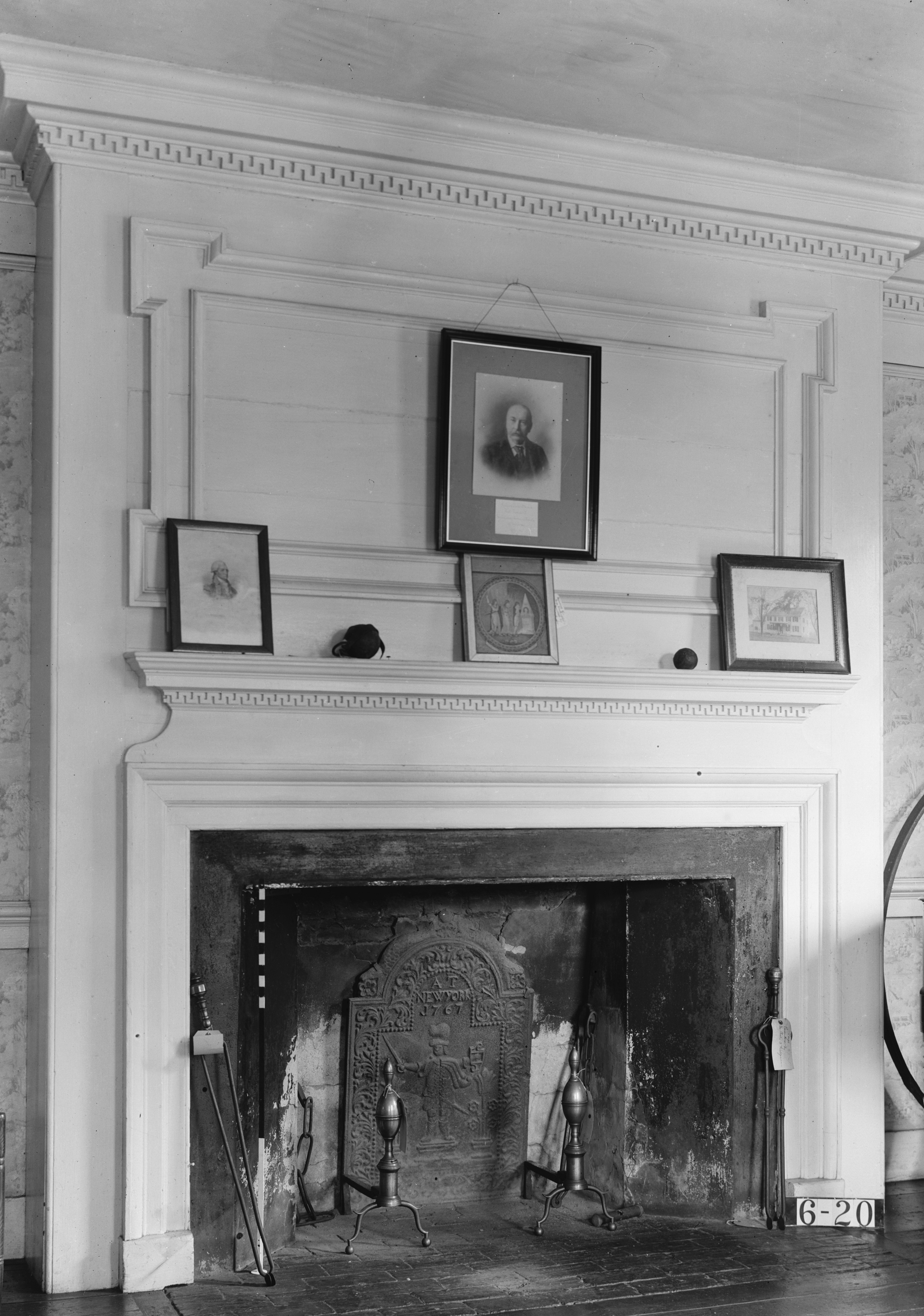
Fireplace

The Continental Army camped in the Watchung Mountains at Middlebrook, 3 miles (4.8 km) from Hope Farm during the winter of 1778–79. The Wallace House became George Washington's headquarters, though he only stayed there for 11 days before leaving to attend the Continental Congress in Philadelphia for 6 weeks. Washington returned in February 1779 bringing his wife Martha. The Washingtons were given use of half the house. He then used the house to host foreign dignitaries and official dinners, and to plan military strategy. In particular, he planned the 1779 campaign against the Iroquois League known as the Sullivan Expedition. Guests at the parties included Benedict Arnold, Nathanael Greene, Alexander Hamilton, Henry Knox, and Baron Steuben.

Washington left on June 3, 1779, and paid Wallace $1,000. The Wallace family and their slaves then returned to their normal lives in the house.

John Wallace, his wife, and his mother-in-law all died in 1783–84, and his youngest son William inherited Hope Farm. William lived there until he died at age 33 in 1796, leaving three orphan children. William's brother Joshua took care of the children and sold Hope Farm to Dickinson Miller in 1801.

The Revolutionary Memorial Society bought the house in 1896, and gave it to the State of New Jersey in 1947.

== See also ==
- List of museums in New Jersey
- List of Washington's Headquarters during the Revolutionary War

Other houses used as headquarters during the second Middlebrook encampment (1778–79):

- Van Veghten House – General Nathanael Greene
- Van Horne House – General William Alexander, Lord Stirling
- Staats House – General Friedrich Wilhelm von Steuben
- Jacobus Vanderveer House – General Henry Knox
