= Mykhailo Bilinskyi =

Ukrainian military leader (1883–1921)

Mykhailo Bilynskyi
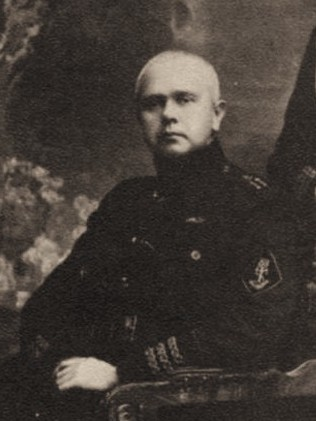
- Naval Minister Mykhailo Bilynskyi
- Born: 12 July 1883 the town of Drabiv, or the village of Drabove-Bariatynske, Zolotonosha Uyezd, Poltava Governorate, Russian Empire
- Died: 17 November 1921 (aged 38) village of Mali Minky, Ovruch Uyezd, Volhynian Governorate, Soviet Ukraine
- Spouse: Hanna Oleksandrivna
- Military career
- Allegiance: Ukrainian People's Republic
- Branch: UPR Marine Corps
- Rank: Rear Admiral of the UPR
- Commands: Organizer and commander of the Marine Division of the Directory of the UPR
- Conflicts: First World War; Ukrainian-Soviet War; First Winter Campaign; Second Winter Campaign †
- Awards: Order of Liberation; Order of Saint Anna, 3rd class; Order of Saint Anna, 4th class; Order of Saint Stanislaus, 3rd class

6th & 8th Minister of Internal Affairs of the Ukrainian People's Republic
- In office 3 May 1920 – 26 May 1920
- Preceded by: Isaak Mazepa
- Succeeded by: Oleksandr Salikovskyi
- In office March 1921 – November 1921
- Preceded by: Oleksandr Salikovskyi
- Succeeded by: office abolished

Mykhailo Ivanovych Bilinskyi or Bilynskyi (Ukrainian: Михайло Іванович Білінський (Білинський); 12 July 1883 – 17 November 1921) was a Ukrainian military leader, Rear Admiral of the Ukrainian People's Republic and leader of the Ukrainian Independence movement. He helped to build up the Ukrainian Maritime Ministry and served as Minister of Maritime Affairs of the UPR.

Bilinskyi also served as Minister of Internal Affairs of the UPR and was the organizer and commander of the Marine Division of the Directory of UPR (1919–1921). He died in battle during the Second Winter Campaign for Ukrainian independence.

== Biography ==
=== Childhood and Youth ===
According to naval records, Mykhailo Bilynskyi (in official documents — Bilinsky) was born on 12 July 1883. His father was most likely Ivan Iasonovych Bilinsky, priest of St. Michael's Church in the town of Drabiv. However, Savchenko-Bilskyi claims that M. I. Bilynskyi was born into the family of a wealthy peasant in the village of Drabove-Bariatynske, now in Cherkasy Oblast. He was of hereditary noble status — his grandfather, Father Iason, was awarded the Order of Saint Anna, 3rd class, in 1870, and in 1884 he, his five children, and grandchildren received noble titles.

After graduating from the 2nd Kyiv Gymnasium, Mykhailo continued his studies at the Lazarev Institute of Oriental Languages in Moscow, mastering Arabic, Armenian, Persian, Turkish, Crimean Tatar, and Georgian, and completing a practical course in Eastern calligraphy.

In a personal card filled out and signed by Bilynskyi on 11 November 1920, he listed the following:

- Nationality — Ukrainian
- Religion — Orthodox Christian
- Education — higher education, specialized naval education
- Profession — sailor, cooperative worker
- Marital status — married
- Military status — naval officer
  - Conscription year 1903
  - Military rank — senior lieutenant of the fleet
- Employed in state institutions since 1906, in the Ukrainian People's Republic since 1917
- Employed in public organizations since 1912
- Political and civic experience — member of the Central Committee of the Ukrainian Party of Independent Socialist-Revolutionaries and member of the All-Ukrainian National Council

=== Service in the Russian Navy ===
Bilynskyi began military service in 1906 as a cadet in the Baltic Fleet. He participated in domestic voyages aboard the training ship Riga. In July 1906 a mutiny broke out aboard the vessel, and Bilynskyi was among those who did not support the revolutionary calls. For helping suppress the uprising, he was awarded the silver medal For Bravery on the St. George ribbon.

In 1907 he served aboard the battleships Panteleimon and Tri Sviatytelia. After passing examinations on 12 September 1908, he received the rank of sub-lieutenant of the Admiralty and was transferred to the 2nd Baltic Fleet Crew. On 3 December 1910, due to his transfer to the 3rd Border Guard Brigade of the Separate Border Guard Corps in Arensburg, he was redesignated as a cornet. He served on the island of Ösel.

At the end of December 1911, Bilynskyi retired to the reserve with the rank of sub-lieutenant and began serving in the Ministry of Finance. In 1914, with the outbreak of World War I, he was mobilized and assigned to the Baltic Fleet, where he commanded a company of recruits of the 2nd Baltic Fleet Crew. In February 1915 he was promoted to lieutenant, and in May 1915 awarded the Order of Saint Stanislaus, 3rd class. In 1916 he received the Order of Saint Anna, 3rd class.

During 1915–1916 Bilynskyi also served aboard ships, first as officer of the watch and later as inspector aboard the yacht Strela. On 31 October 1916 he received his first naval rank — midshipman. During the revolutionary year 1917 and early 1918 he served as assistant commander of the 2nd Baltic Fleet Crew.

== In Ukrainian service ==
=== Pro-Ukrainian Activity in the Baltic Fleet ===
With the outbreak of revolutionary events in Petrograd, Bilynskyi became actively involved in political and public life. Together with Lieutenant Sviatoslav Shramchenko, he organized the Ukrainian Naval Revolutionary Headquarters of the Baltic Fleet. This organization united Ukrainian sailors serving in the Baltic Fleet and actively promoted the idea of Ukrainian autonomy. At that time more than 12,000 sailors in the Baltic Fleet identified themselves as Ukrainians.

On the initiative of Bilynskyi, Shramchenko, and other activists, the cruiser Svetlana and destroyers Ukraina and Haidamak were "Ukrainized" through personnel exchanges with other ships. On 12 October 1917 Ukrainian blue-and-yellow flags were raised on the ships. They were intended to be transferred into the future Ukrainian naval forces. However, the Bolshevik seizure of power and organizational struggles of navy institutions prevented the realization of these plans, forcing Ukrainian sailors to leave Petrograd and return to Ukraine.

The raising of Ukrainian flags on the Baltic Fleet caused a major reaction of the Black Sea Fleet. On the same day, Ukrainian national flags were raised on the battleships Volia, Georgii Pobedonosets, the armored cruiser Potemkin (renamed Fighter for Freedom), and other vessels.

=== Period of the Central Rada ===
Bilynskyi arrived to Kyiv when work had only just begun on the creation of the General Secretariat of Naval Affairs of the Ukrainian People's Republic. A member of the Central Committee of the Ukrainian Party of Socialist-Independists, he became an active organizer of the Secretariat, established on 22 December 1917 under Dmytro Antonovych. Under the Central Rada he served on the commission for concluding a peace treaty with Romania and was present in Berlin for the signing of the Treaty of Brest-Litovsk as a naval affairs specialist.

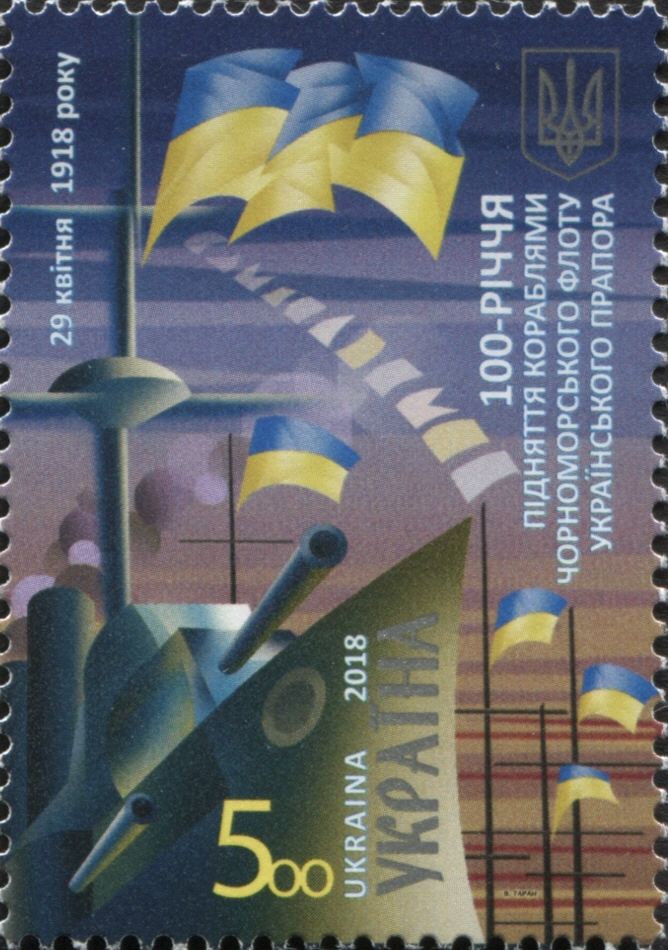
A stamp depicting Ukrainian flags being raised by warships in Sevastopol; issued for the 100th anniversary on April 29, 2018

=== Hetmanate of Skoropadskyi ===
By order of 24 April 1918, Senior Lieutenant Mykhailo Bilinsky was appointed chairman of a commission "for the creation of general staffing structures" of the Naval Ministry. During the rule of Hetman Pavlo Skoropadskyi, Bilynskyi served as assistant chief of the Main Economic Directorate of the Naval Ministry.

On 29 April, the entire Black Sea Fleet was handed over to the Ukrainian People's Republic. Mikhail Sablin was appointed Commander-in-Chief of the Navy, and a telegram was sent out to Kyiv: "Effective today the Sevastopol fortress and the Fleet in Sevastopol raised the Ukrainian flag. Sablin assumed the command of the Fleet". Having no reply the admiral ordered to repeat the telegram beginning with the words "Comrades of [the] Kiev Central Rada...", unaware that the Rada had been deposed by Skoropadskyi.

From May to October 1918 Bilynskyi was a member of the Ukrainian delegation headed by Serhii Shelukhin, which negotiated peace terms with Soviet Russia.

=== Ukrainian People's Republic ===
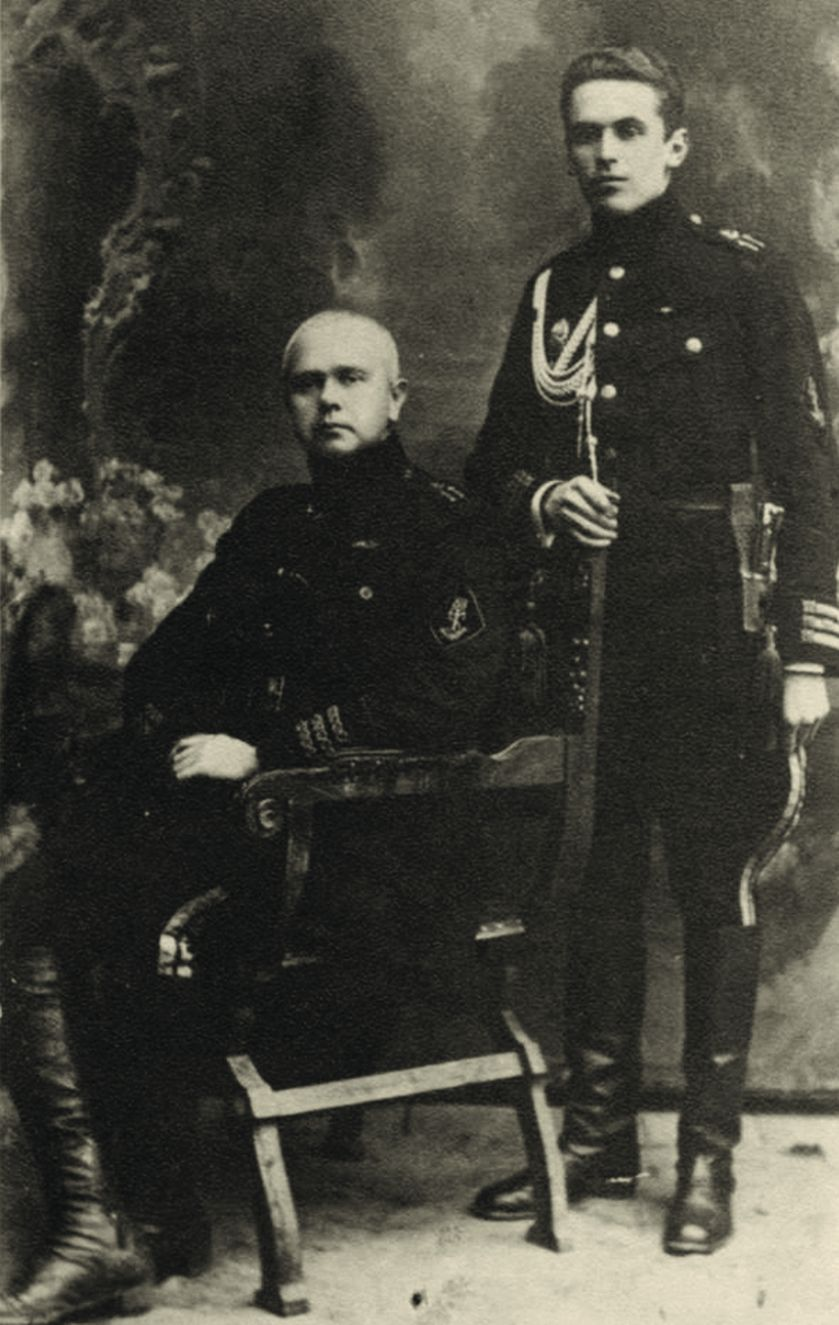
Command of the Ukrainian People's Republic's Marine Division, Mykhailo Bilynskyi on the right (1919)

After the fall of the Hetmanate on 26 December 1918, Bilynskyi was appointed Minister of Naval Affairs of the Ukrainian People's Republic. His deputies were Rear Admiral Mykhailo Ostrohradskyi and Chief of the Naval General Staff Captain 1st Rank Lev Postryhanev. By order of Symon Petliura, Supreme Otaman of the UPR Army and Fleet, Bilynskyi was granted the rank of rear admiral. Upon assuming office, he ordered commander Vyacheslav Klochkovskyi to raise Ukrainian naval ensigns on all ships, which were confirmed by UPR law. Bilynskyi initiated extensive legislative work aimed at creating a solid legal and organizational basis for a national navy and hoped through international law to restore Ukraine's fleet and naval bases. On 11 January 1919 he enacted the Law on the Midshipmen School and organized its work in Mykolaiv and later in Kamianets-Podilskyi.

On 20 January 1919 a special law approved the structure of the Naval Ministry and General Staff and established technical, construction, hydrographic, judicial, and sanitary departments. Funds were sent to Mykolaiv to complete construction of new ships and settle debts to shipbuilders. Under the Law on the Fleet, the Directory assigned Ukrainian names to ships under construction: the dreadnought Soborna Ukraina, light cruisers Hetman Bohdan Khmelnytsky, Hetman Petro Doroshenko, and Taras Shevchenko. However, on 1 February 1919 the Entente fleet occupied Kherson, and on 2 February Mykolaiv, cutting the UPR off from the Black Sea. On 3 February the government of Symon Petliura was forced to leave Kyiv under pressure from the Red Army.

Bilynskyi began organizing marine infantry regiments. According to orders of Symon Petliura and the law On the Organization of Naval Forces on the Black Sea Coast, the territory around Mykolaiv, Ochakiv, and Kherson was declared the Maritime Front, with Bilynskyi as commander. In February 1919 he proposed the creation of the first marine infantry regiment. Since UPR forces retreated westward, the regiment was formed in Galicia from former sailors of the Austro-Hungarian Adriatic Fleet and local Hutsul lumber rafters, who became the core of the 1st Hutsul Marine Infantry Regiment.

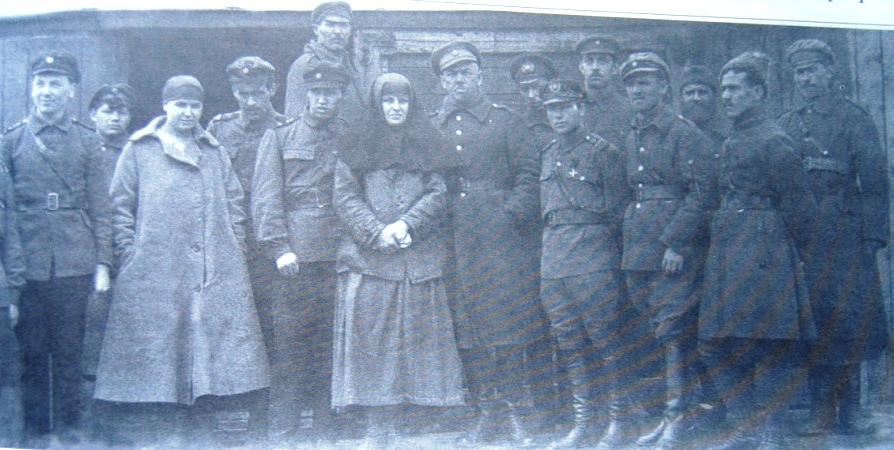
Ukrainian marines in 1921

On 24 April 1919 Bilynskyi resigned in protest against the policies of the Directory and was appointed commander of the newly formed Marine Infantry Division. His ministerial duties were transferred to Captain 1st Rank Mykola Zlobin. In May 1919, when it became clear that the Black Sea Fleet could not be reclaimed, Bilynsky formed a marine division. On 12 June he was arrested in Kamianets-Podilskyi on accusations of involvement in Colonel Petro Bolbochan's alleged coup plot. After protesting the arrest with a hunger strike, he was released, but was barred from promotion in rank.

On 24 July 1919 he began forming the 2nd Marine Infantry Regiment under Lieutenant Ilko Sych. A 3rd regiment was later formed in Brody, and the Marine Infantry Division was sent to the outskirts of Volochysk in order to fight against the Red Army. In September 1919 the Naval Ministry was abolished and its functions transferred to the Naval Directorate of the Military Ministry. Bilynskyi remained with the marines on the front lines and joined the First Winter Campaign of the UPR Army. He was later interned in Poland with the UPR Army.

== Exile in Poland ==
The government of the Ukrainian People's Republic continued to operate in exile in Poland after 1920, while Ukrainian military personnel were held in internment camps administered with the cooperation of Polish authorities. After the defeat of the Ukrainian People's Republic, Bilynskyi remained active in the émigré government structures in Poland. On 3 May 1920 Prime Minister Isaak Mazepa appointed Bilynskyi Minister of Internal Affairs. He headed a joint commission working on draft constitutions for the UPR. On 18 October 1920 he was appointed adviser to the Ministry of National Economy.

In spring 1921 he joined the government of Andrii Livytskyi as Minister of Internal Affairs. As a cabinet member he entered the Supreme Military Council in March. On 19 May he chaired a commission revising the statute of the Order of the Republic, though the order was never approved. After the resignation of Prokopovych's government he temporarily served as acting Minister of Finance. In autumn 1921 he allocated 20,000 Polish marks for the establishment of the Main Military-Historical Museum-Archive of the UPR. He also served as chief of the civil administration of the headquarters of Yurko Tiutiunnyk's Insurgent Army.

== Second Winter Campaign ==
Bilynskyi participated in the Second Winter Campaign of 1921 in Soviet Ukraine. On 26 October he arrived to the border village of Malyi Mydsk. On 2 November he was appointed chief of supplies of the Insurgent Army. On 12 November the Volhynian Group fought the cavalry of the 9th Cavalry Division under Grigory Kotovsky. During the battle for the crossing of the Teteriv river near the village of Miniiky, Bilynskyi was wounded but did not leave the battlefield. On 17 November 1921 the Volhynian Group fought the 2nd and 3rd Brigades of the 9th Cavalry Division. Part of the Ukrainian troops became encircled near the village of Mali Minky in Ovruch County. Refusing to surrender, Bilynskyi shot himself. He was later buried by local peasants.

Hell had arrived. It was no longer a battle of maneuver warfare. It was a massacre. There was no mercy. The insurgents, trapped in this circle of death, fought heroically… Wounded Lieutenant Bilynskyi, former Minister of Naval Affairs of Ukraine, shot several Red Army soldiers from his wagon with a Browning pistol and used the last bullet on himself.

— Sotnyk of artillery Hryhorii Rohoznyi

The émigré government of the UPR posthumously promoted Bilynskyi to the rank of rear admiral.

== Commemoration ==
- There is Captain Bilynskyi Street in Lviv and Mykhailo Bilynskyi Street in Kyiv.
- In July 2016 a memorial plaque honoring Bilynskyi was unveiled at the Drabiv Local History Museum.
- On 5 July 2019, by decree of the President of Ukraine, the 36th Separate Marine Brigade of the Ukrainian Naval Infantry was named after Mykhailo Bilynskyi.
- In Zaporizhzhia, Pestel Street was renamed Mykhailo Bilynskyi Street.
- In Mykolaiv, General Shepetov Street was renamed Rear Admiral Bilynskyi Street.
- In Odesa, Amvrosii Buchma Street was renamed Mykhailo Bilynskyi Street.

== Literature ==
- V. I. Holovchenko. Bilinskyi Mykhailo Ivanovych // Ukrainian Diplomatic Encyclopedia. Kyiv, 2004.
- Encyclopedia of Cherkashchyna. Kyiv, 2010.
- Vasyl Veryha. The November Raid of 1921. Kyiv, 2011.
- Oleh Shatailo. Heirs of Cossack Glory.
