= Polessky =

Polessky (masculine), Polesskaya (feminine), or Polesskoye (neuter) may refer to:

- Polessky District, a district of Kaliningrad Oblast, Russia
- Polesskoye Urban Settlement, a municipal formation which the town of district significance of Polessk in Polessky District of Kaliningrad Oblast, Russia is incorporated as
- Poliske (Polesskoye), an abandoned town in Kyiv Oblast, Ukraine
- Poliske, Narodychi Raion, an abandoned village in Zhytomyr Oblast, Ukraine
- Poliske, Korosten Raion, a village in Zhytomyr Oblast, Ukraine
