= Filipp Zhmachenko =

Soviet Army colonel general

Filipp Feodosyevich Zhmachenko
- Филипп Феодосьевич Жмаченко
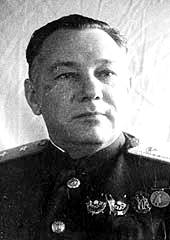
- Born: 26 November [O.S. 14 November] 1895; Mogilno, Ovruchsky Uyezd, Volhynian Governorate, Russian Empire
- Died: 19 June 1966 (aged 70); Kiev, Soviet Union
- Military career
- Allegiance: Russian Empire; RSFSR; Soviet Union
- Branch: Red Army
- Service years: Russian Empire (1915–1917); Soviet Union (1917–1960)
- Rank: Colonel general
- Commands: 67th Rifle Corps; 3rd Army; 47th Army; 40th Army
- Conflicts: First World War; Russian Civil War; Second World War
- Awards: Hero of the Soviet Union; Order of Lenin (twice); Order of the Red Banner (four times); Order of Suvorov First Class; Order of Kutuzov First Class; Order of Bogdan Khmelnitsky First Class (twice); Order of the Red Star; Order of the Badge of Honour

Filipp Feodosyevich Zhmachenko (Russian: Филипп Феодосьевич Жмаченко; Ukrainian: Пилип Феодосійович Жмаченко; 26 November [O.S. 14 November] 1895 – 19 June 1966) was a Soviet Army colonel general and Hero of the Soviet Union.

== Early life, World War I and Russian Civil War ==
Filipp Feodosyevich Zhmachenko was born on 26 November 1895 to a Ukrainian peasant family in the village of Mogilno, Ovruchsky Uyezd in the Volhynian Governorate. After graduating from the village school in 1906, he became a railway repair worker. During World War I, Zhmachenko was conscripted into the Imperial Russian Army in May 1915 and enlisted as a ryadovoy to a reserve pontoon bridge battalion. In August of that year he was sent to the Southwestern Front, where he fought with the 1st Pontoon Bridge Battalion. In March 1917, after the February Revolution, he was elected a member of the regimental committee, and in May became chairman of the soldier's committee of the battalion. In July he was arrested for Bolshevik activities, but was soon freed at the request of soldiers.

After the October Revolution, Zhmachenko joined the 1st Red Guard Socialist Detachment in November at Khotin. With the detachment, Zhmachenko fought against German troops and the Ukrainian People's Army. He served in the political department of the 17th Rifle Division from June 1918. In November of that year, he became chairman of the revolutionary committee and deputy chairman of the governorate Cheka in Volyn Governate. From July 1919, he commanded a company in the 393rd and 5th Tarashchansky regiments of the 44th Rifle Division of the 12th Army of the Southwestern Front. In November he rose to command a battalion of the 418th Rifle Regiment. With the 44th, Zhmachenko fought against the White Armed Forces of South Russia near Kiev and Chernigov.

He was transferred to the 47th Rifle Division in February 1920, commanding a battalion of the 422nd Rifle Regiment. Subsequently, as part of the 58th Rifle Regiment of the 7th Rifle Division of the 14th Army, Zhmachenko fought in the Polish–Soviet War. He was captured but escaped and in late 1920 returned to the 7th Rifle Division, serving as an instructor of its political department. In this position he took part in the suppression of Stanislav Bulak-Balakhovich's forces in the Ovruch region, and the fight against the Revolutionary Insurgent Army of Ukraine.

== Interwar period ==
After the end of combat operations, Zhmachenko continued serving with the 7th Rifle Division in the Ukrainian Military District as military commissar of the 56th and 62nd Regiments. After graduating from the Kharkov Courses for Military Commissars in 1923, he became military commissar of the 2nd and 4th Regiments of the 1st Cavalry Division. Zhmachenko transferred to the Kharkov School for Red Starshinas in August 1924, serving as assistant chief for the political section. After graduating from the Vystrel course in November 1926 he was appointed assistant commander of the 69th Rifle Regiment of the 23rd Rifle Division.

Rising to command the 239th Rifle Regiment of the 80th Rifle Division in November 1928, Zhmachenko was sent to the Soviet Far East in March 1932 to command the 207th Rifle Regiment of the 69th Rifle Division of the Special Red Banner Far Eastern Army. He was promoted to command the 5th Separate Rifle Brigade in March 1937 and in July of that year took command of the 92nd Rifle Division of the army. In February 1938 he received the rank of kombrig, but in June was dismissed from the army on a false denunciation and imprisoned during the Great Purge. Zhmachenko was freed and restored to the army in July 1939, and in November of that year appointed chief of the 2nd Department of the staff of the Kharkov Military District. He rose to chief of the district combat training department in September 1940, and took command of the 67th Rifle Corps in March 1941.

== World War II ==
After the start of Operation Barbarossa, the 67th Rifle Corps became in July 1941 part of the 21st Army of the Western Front and under the command of Zhmachenko, participated in the Battle of Babruysk during the Battle of Smolensk. In mid-July 1941, he was replaced as commander by Kuzma Galitsky. He then received command of the 42nd Rifle Division, but was wounded and out of action until September 1941.

From September 1941 he was Deputy Commander of the 38th Army of the Southwestern Front. In February–May 1942, he became commander of the 3rd Army of the Bryansk Front. In September 1943 he was appointed commander of the 47th Army of the Voronezh Front.

From October 1943 until the end of the war, he commanded the 40th Army. With his army, he fought in the Battle of Kiev (1943), Dnieper–Carpathian Offensive, Second Jassy–Kishinev Offensive, Bucharest-Arad Offensive, Battle of Debrecen, Siege of Budapest, Banská Bystrica and Bratislava–Brno Offensive, Prague Offensive, and the capture of Romania, Hungary and Czechoslovakia.

In October 1943, Zhmachenko was awarded the title Hero of the Soviet Union for crossing the Dnieper River and holding the bridgehead south of Kiev.

== Postwar ==
He was promoted to the rank of colonel general on 29 May 1945. After the war, he was appointed deputy commander of the Central Group of Forces in Austria. Since 1949, he was the deputy commander of the Belarusian Military District and in November 1953 of the Carpathian Military District. In 1955–1960, he was Chairman of the Central Committee of the DOSAAF of the Ukrainian SSR.

He retired in 1960 and died in Kiev on 19 June 1966. A street in the city was named after him.

== Sources ==
- Generals.dk
- the article in the Russian Wikipedia, Жмаченко, Филипп Феодосьевич.
