= St. Sophia Ukrainian Orthodox Theological Seminary =

Saint Sophia Ukrainian Orthodox Theological Seminary
- Type: Seminary
- Established: 1975; 51 years ago
- Founder: Mstyslav Skrypnyk
- Accreditation: Association of Theological Schools in the United States and Canada
- Religious affiliation: Ukrainian Orthodox Church of the USA
- Students: 23 (fall 2024)
- Location: South Bound Brook, New Jersey, United States; 40°32′35.088″N 74°31′7.1718″W
- Website: https://stsuots.edu/

Saint Sophia Ukrainian Orthodox Theological Seminary (Ukrainian: Софійська українська православна богословська семінарія), situated in South Bound Brook, New Jersey, is the central seminary of the Ukrainian Orthodox Church of the USA (UOC of USA).

== History ==
The seminary was established in 1975 with the guidance of Metropolitan Mstyslav Skrypnyk in order to serve the needs of the Ukrainian Orthodox Church of the USA. The institution's theological library is in Somerset, New Jersey, and focuses on materials related to Ukraine, Orthodox Christianity, and related areas. It is located very close to the mother church of the UOC of USA, Saint Andrew Memorial Church.

== Academics ==
Saint Sophia's Seminary is accredited by the Association of Theological Schools in the United States and Canada, according to whom the institution had 23 students and no full-time faculty as of fall 2024. It is approved to grant Master of Divinity and Master of Arts in applied Orthodox studies diplomas, along with conducting online education. It is also authorized to grant degrees by the state of New Jersey.
