= Poliske, Korosten Raion =

Poliske Поліське Полесское
- Village
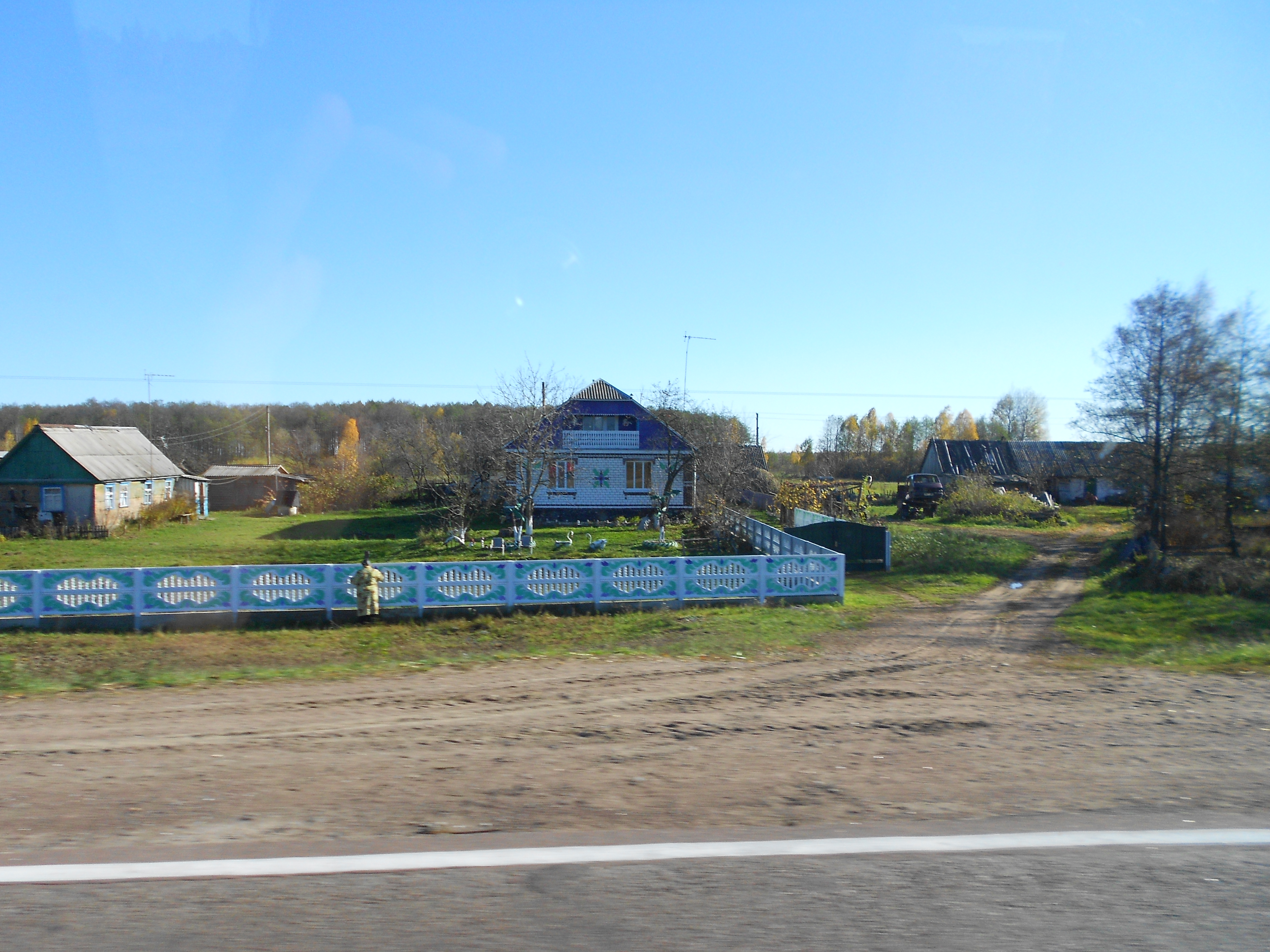

- Location within Zhytomyr Oblast Location within Ukraine
- Coordinates: 50°54′14″N 28°32′23″E
- Country: Ukraine
- Oblast: Zhytomyr Oblast
- Raion: Korosten Raion
- Established: 1789

Area
  - Total: 2.25 km^{2} (0.87 sq mi)

Population (2001)
  - Total: 884
  - Density: 393/km^{2} (1,020/sq mi)
- Postal code: 11555
- Area code: (+380) 4142

Poliske (Ukrainian: Поліське, Russian: Полесское) is a village in Korosten Raion in Zhytomyr Oblast. It was known as Mohylne (Ukrainian: Могильне; Russian: Могильно) before 1960, and was first mentioned in 1789. According to the 2001 Ukrainian census, its population was 884. It was the seat of a village council until 2016, when the village council was abolished and it came under the jurisdiction of the Ushomyr village council.

== Geography ==
Poliske is located on the left bank of the Uzh River, 10 kilometers (6.2 mi) southwest of Korosten. The Korosten–Zhytomyr highway passes through the village.

== History ==
Mogilno was first mentioned in 1789. It was part of the Iskorostskaya volost of Ovruchsky Uyezd, Volhynian Governorate from 1795. In 1921 it became part of Korostensky Uyezd when Ovruchsky Uyezd was split. It became part of Korostensky Okrug on 7 March 1923, Volynsky Okrug on 13 June 1930, and Korosten Raion on 28 February 1940. It was renamed Poliske on 8 June 1960. From 1923 it was the administrative center of the Mogilnyanskaya village council, which became the Poliskaya village council when the village was renamed in 1960.

By 1973, the village included a secondary school and a library. It was part of the Progres collective farm.

== Notable residents ==
- Filipp Zhmachenko, Soviet general, born in 1895 in Mogilno
