= Staats House (South Bound Brook, New Jersey) =

Historic house in New Jersey, United States

- U.S. National Register of Historic Places
- New Jersey Register of Historic Places
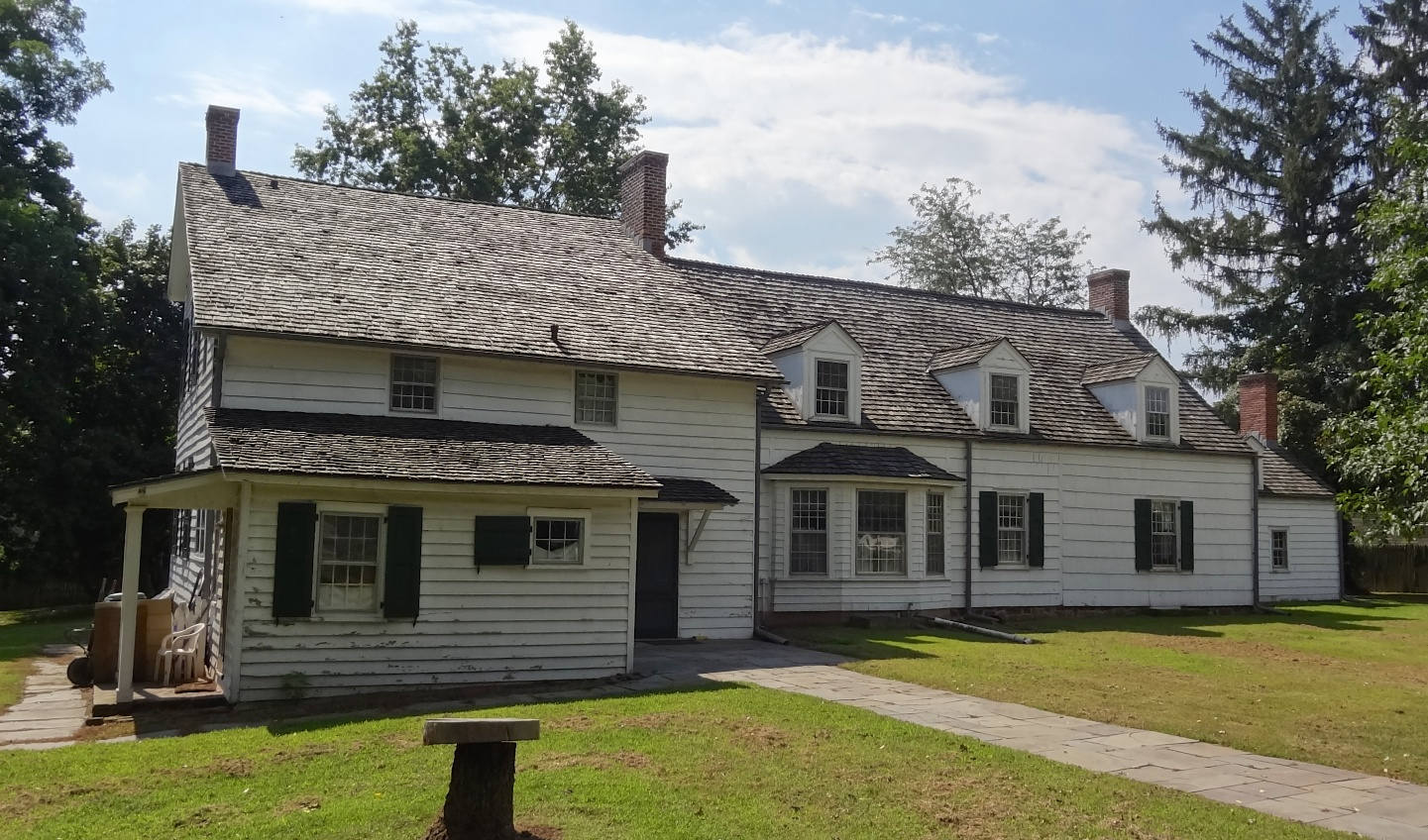
- Abraham Staats House, 2013

- Location within Somerset County, New Jersey Location within New Jersey Location within the United States
- Location: 17 Von Steuben Lane, South Bound Brook, New Jersey
- Coordinates: 40°33′6″N 74°31′16″W
- Area: 3.5 acres (1.4 ha)
- Built: c. 1740
- Architectural style: Colonial, Federal
- NRHP reference No.: 02001483
- NJRHP No.: 256

Significant dates
- Added to NRHP: December 4, 2002
- Designated NJRHP: August 29, 2002

The Staats House, also known as the General Baron von Steuben Headquarters, is a historic building located at 17 Von Steuben Lane in South Bound Brook, Somerset County, New Jersey. Constructed c. 1740, it is now known as the Abraham Staats House after its second owner. In 1779, during the second Middlebrook encampment of the American Revolutionary War, it served as the headquarters for Prussian-American General Friedrich Wilhelm von Steuben. The house was added to the National Register of Historic Places on December 4, 2002, and noted as representing "one of the finest remaining buildings from the second phase of Dutch immigration and settlement in the Raritan Valley".

== History ==
In 1740, Hendrick Staats was granted the farm from his father, Peter Staats, who was from Brooklyn. In 1769, Hendrick gave the property to his brother John Staats (1713–1781). John then transferred it to his son Abraham Staats (1743–1821) in November 1770. After Abraham and his wife died, the property was divided between their son Issac Staats and his five sisters.

== Revolutionary War ==
At the Battle of Bound Brook, on April 13, 1777, private property was taken during the raid by British forces. Staats filed a detailed report in 1782, which included several animals, wheat, and clothing.

Von Steuben, who had been appointed Inspector General of the Continental Army by Congress on May 5, 1778, arrived at the Staats House on March 26, 1779, during the second Middlebrook encampment. During the Valley Forge encampment, he had begun work on the Regulations for the Order and Discipline of the Troops of the United States, which was approved by Congress on March 29.

On May 2, 1779, a review of the army was held to honor the French minister Conrad Alexandre Gérard de Rayneval and the Spanish diplomat Juan de Miralles. Led by General William Smallwood, four battalions performed precise military formations to demonstrate their mastery of von Steuben's training. After the review, about sixty generals and colonels attended a dinner hosted by von Steuben in a large tent near the house. Here Gérard told General George Washington that Comte d'Estaing's fleet would assist him in the war and that supplies from France would be increased.

== Gallery ==
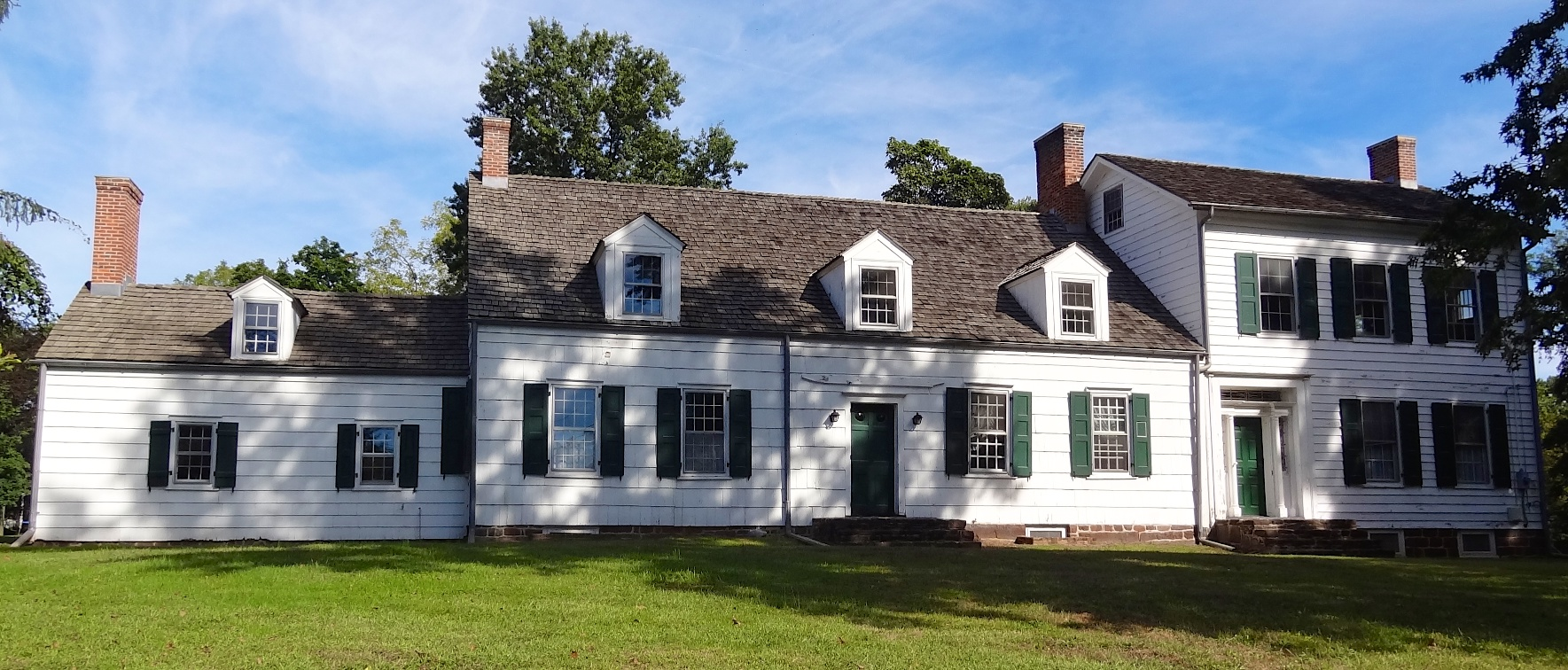
Abraham Staats House, south view

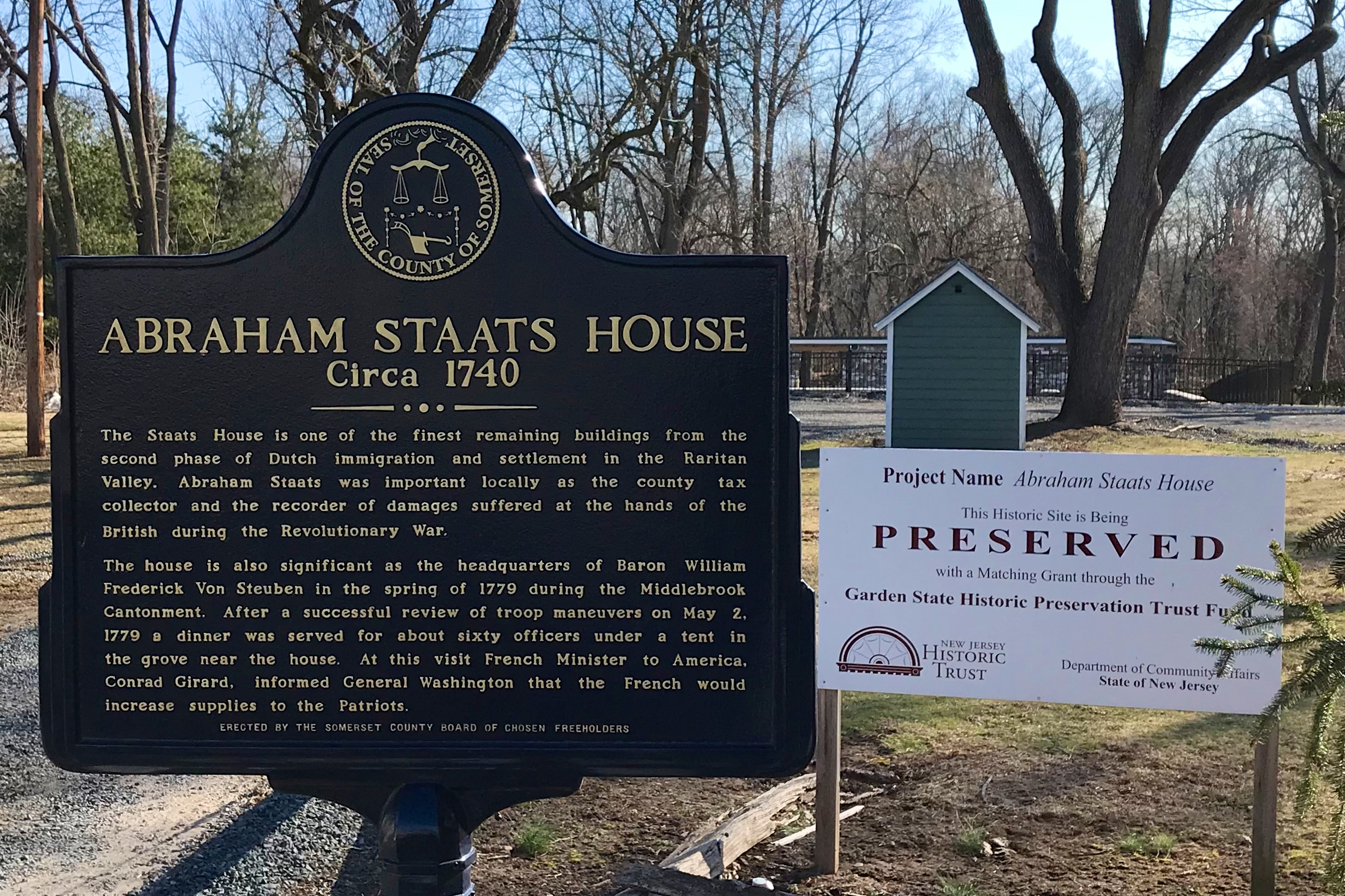
Somerset County historical information

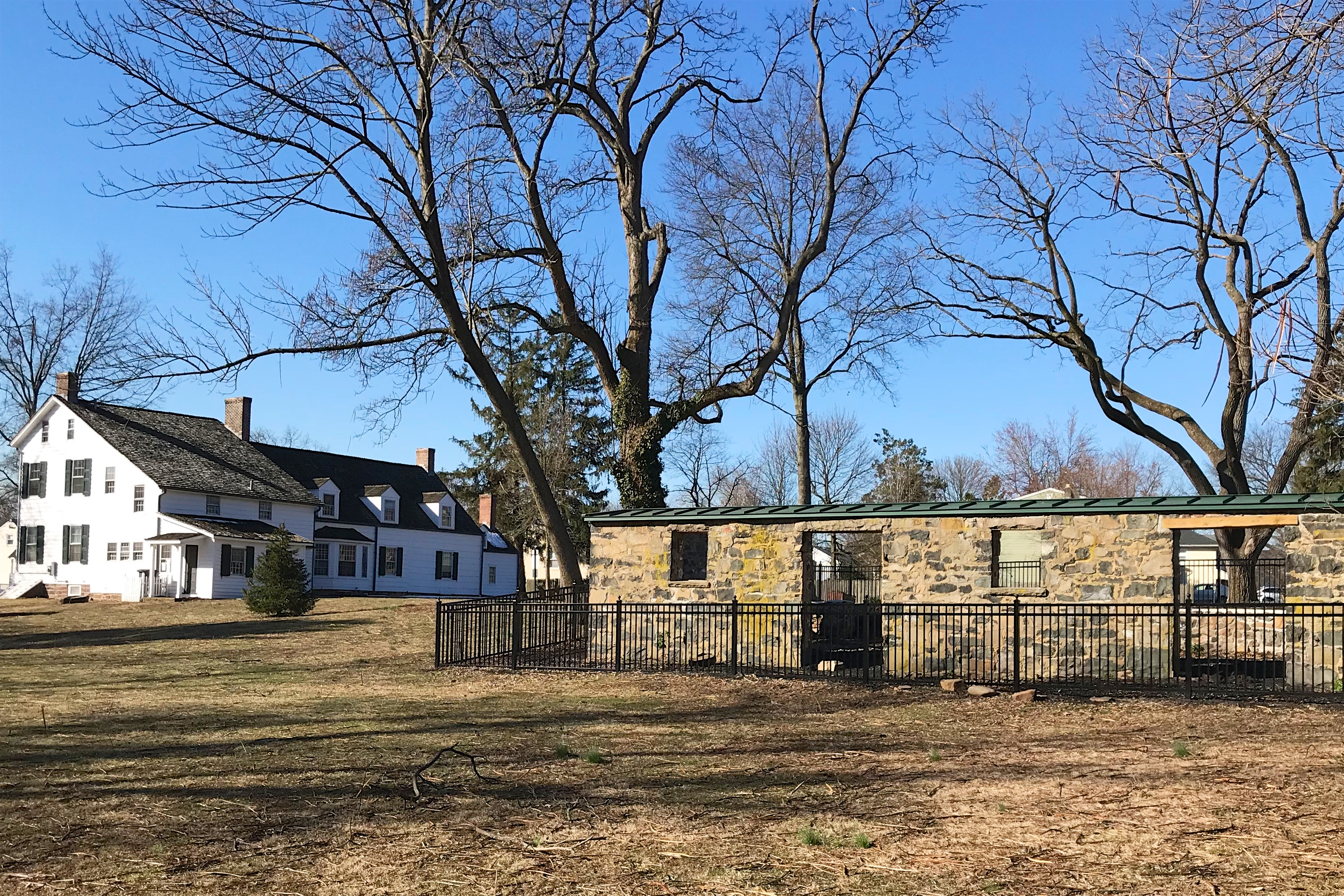
House and remains of the barn, 2018

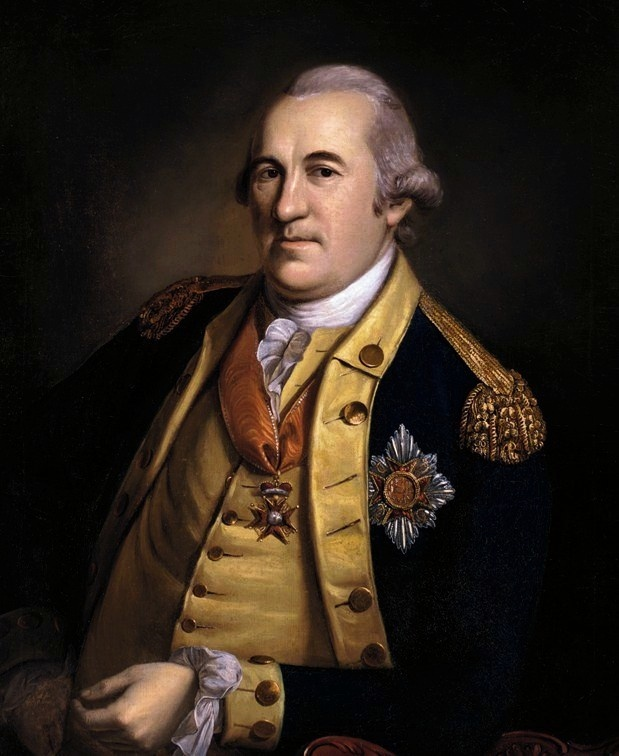
Baron Frederick William von Steuben, by Charles Willson Peale, 1780

== See also ==
Other houses used as headquarters during the second Middlebrook encampment (1778–79):

- Wallace House – General George Washington
- Van Horne House – General William Alexander, Lord Stirling
- Van Veghten House – General Nathanael Greene
- Jacobus Vanderveer House – General Henry Knox
