= Oleksandr Shramchenko =

Oleksandr Mykolayovych Shramchenko (Ukrainian: Олександр Миколайович Шрамченко)(1859 — 1921) was a cultural activist and ethnographer whose heritage takes roots in the lands of Chernihiv.

In 1887, he finished the Historical-Theological department of the Kyiv University. Until 1909, he gave lectures in regions of the Caucasus mountains and lands of Chełm where he was collecting folkloric evidences. After that Oleksandr moved to Kyiv where he became a member of the Scientific Society. His works were published in the magazine Kyiv Old Times. Later he became an editor of other magazines and journals such as Ukraine and Ukrainian Ethnographic Collection (the latter was a magazine of the Scientific Society). From 1919, Shramchenko was a secretary of the All-People's Library Committee of the All-Ukrainian Academy of Science. He also translated works of Volodymyr Antonovych.

== Family ==
- Oleksandr Shramchenko — his ancestor, Levko Shramchenko, was an obozny in the Nizhyn Polk.
- Son — Sviatoslav and two daughters — Olena and Liudmila all were born in Baku at the end of the 19th century.
- Sister - Hanna Shramchenko (1852–1931).
