= Sviatoslav Shramchenko =

Ukrainian admiral (1893–1958)

- Святослав Шрамченко
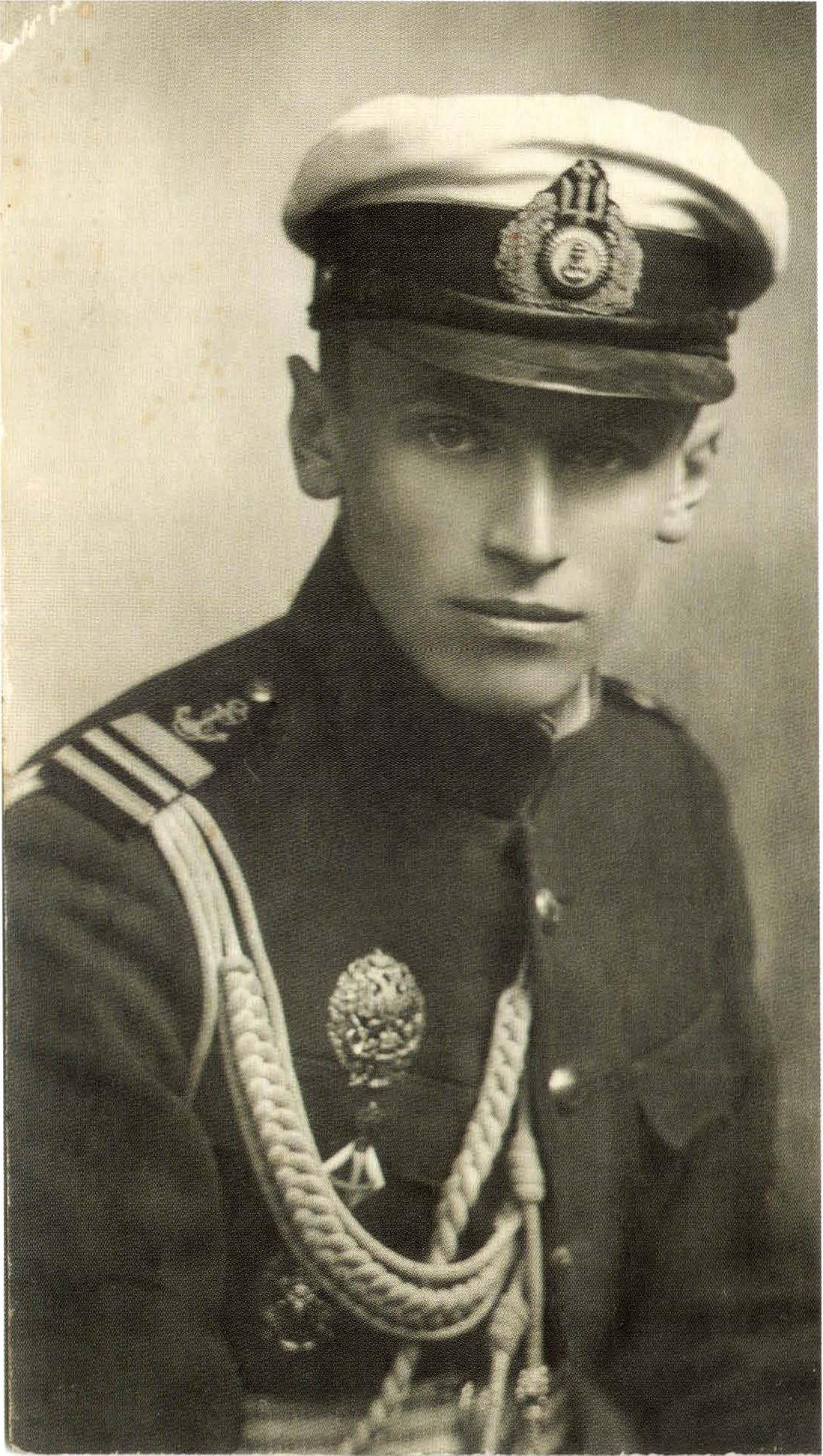
- Born: May 3, 1893; Baku, Russian Empire (now Azerbaijan)
- Died: June 24, 1958 (aged 65); Philadelphia, Pennsylvania, United States
- Military career
- Allegiance: Ukrainian People's Republic
- Branch: Ukrainian People's Army (Navy)
- Service years: 1916—1921
- Rank: Captain lieutenant
- Conflicts: First World War; Ukrainian–Soviet War

Sviatoslav Oleksandrovych Shramchenko (Note: Ukrainian: Святослав Олександрович Шрамченко, romanized: Sviatoslav Oleksandrovych Shramchenko) (May 3, 1893 – June 24, 1958) was a Ukrainian military and community leader, captain lieutenant of the Ukrainian People's Republic Navy, writer and famous philatelist (had a collection of 16,000 stamps). He was a son of Oleksandr Shramchenko, Ukrainian ethnographer.

== Biography ==
Sviatoslav Shramchenko was born in Baku (Azerbaijan, Russian Empire) on May 3, 1893. He graduated from first classical school in Kyiv, then Gardes de la Marine School and the Military Law Academy in Petrograd.

After the First World War Shramchenko became one of founders of the Navy Ukrainian People's Republic and Ukrainian State. In 1917 he was a participant of ukrainization in the Baltic Fleet. At the time of the Hetmanate and the Directorate he was a permanent adjutant of the marine ministers, in 1919 Shramchenko for some time acted as Minister of Marine.

After the end of Ukrainian War of Independence Sviatoslav Shramchenko immigrated to Częstochowa (Poland), where he was a head of various Ukrainian organizations. In 1957, he left Poland and settled in Philadelphia, US. Here he wrote many articles and publications on naval and military themes in different magazines.

On June 24, 1958, Shramchenko died of a heart attack. He was buried at Orthodox Cemetery in South Bound Brook.
