= Queen's Bridge (New Jersey) =

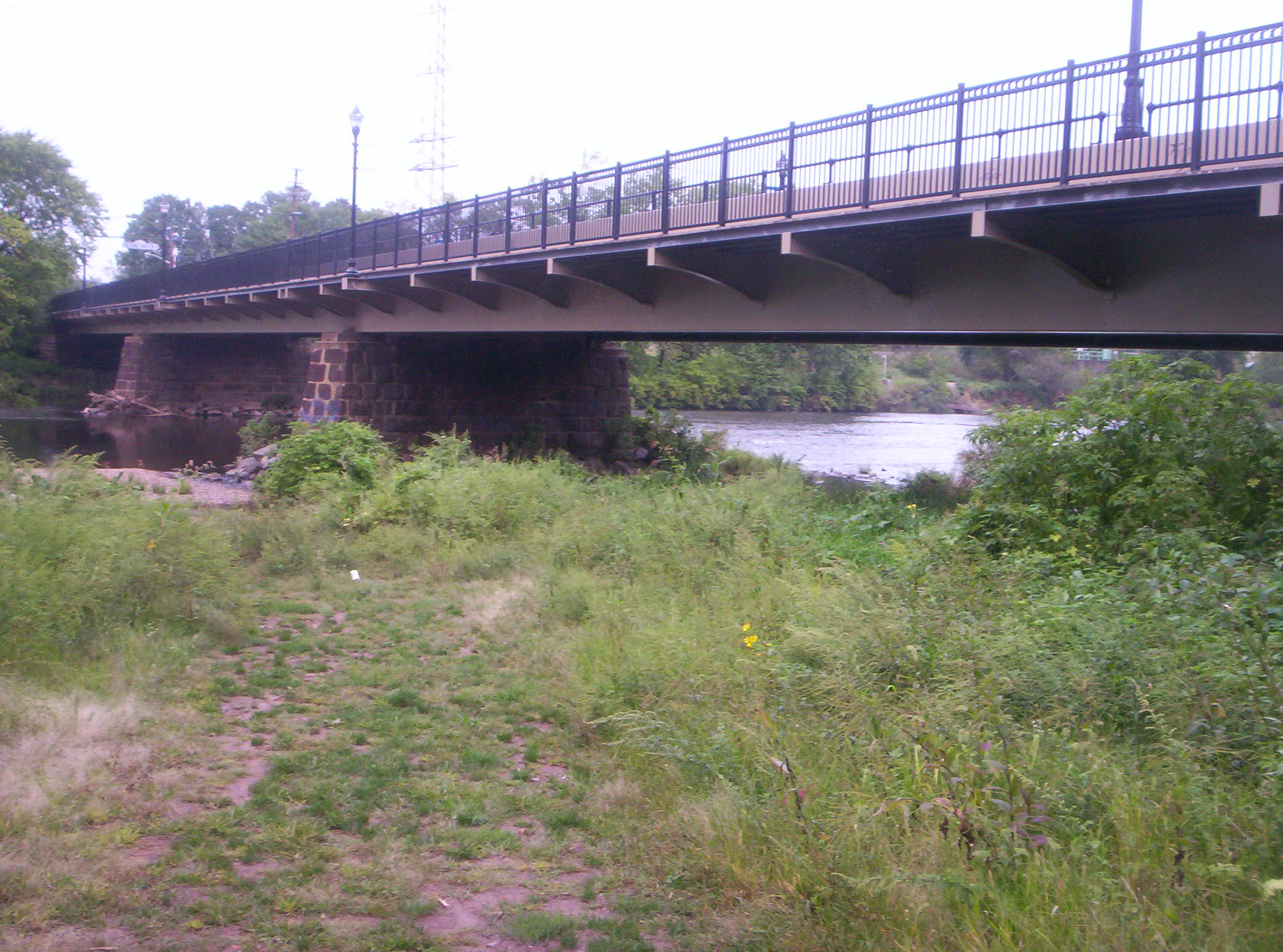
- Coordinates: 40°33′35″N 74°31′40″W
- Carries: 2 lanes of South Main Street
- Crosses: Raritan River
- Locale: South Bound Brook, New Jersey and Bound Brook, New Jersey

Statistics
- Toll: None

Location
- Interactive map of Queen's Bridge

The Queen's Bridge is a bridge spanning the Raritan River that connects South Bound Brook and Bound Brook, both of which are in Somerset County, New Jersey. The bridge carries South Main Street across the river.

== History ==
The earliest Queen's Bridge was completed in 1731, ordered by an act of the colonial government in 1728. It was likely named after Queen Caroline, wife of King George II.

Another early bridge at this site was a wooden one built in 1767. Later, in 1771, an act was passed that provided for the maintenance of the bridge as the Queen's Bridge. Over a hundred years later, a class steel pipe truss bridge was built at the site in 1875 to replace the previous one. The current bridge's span was built in 1984.

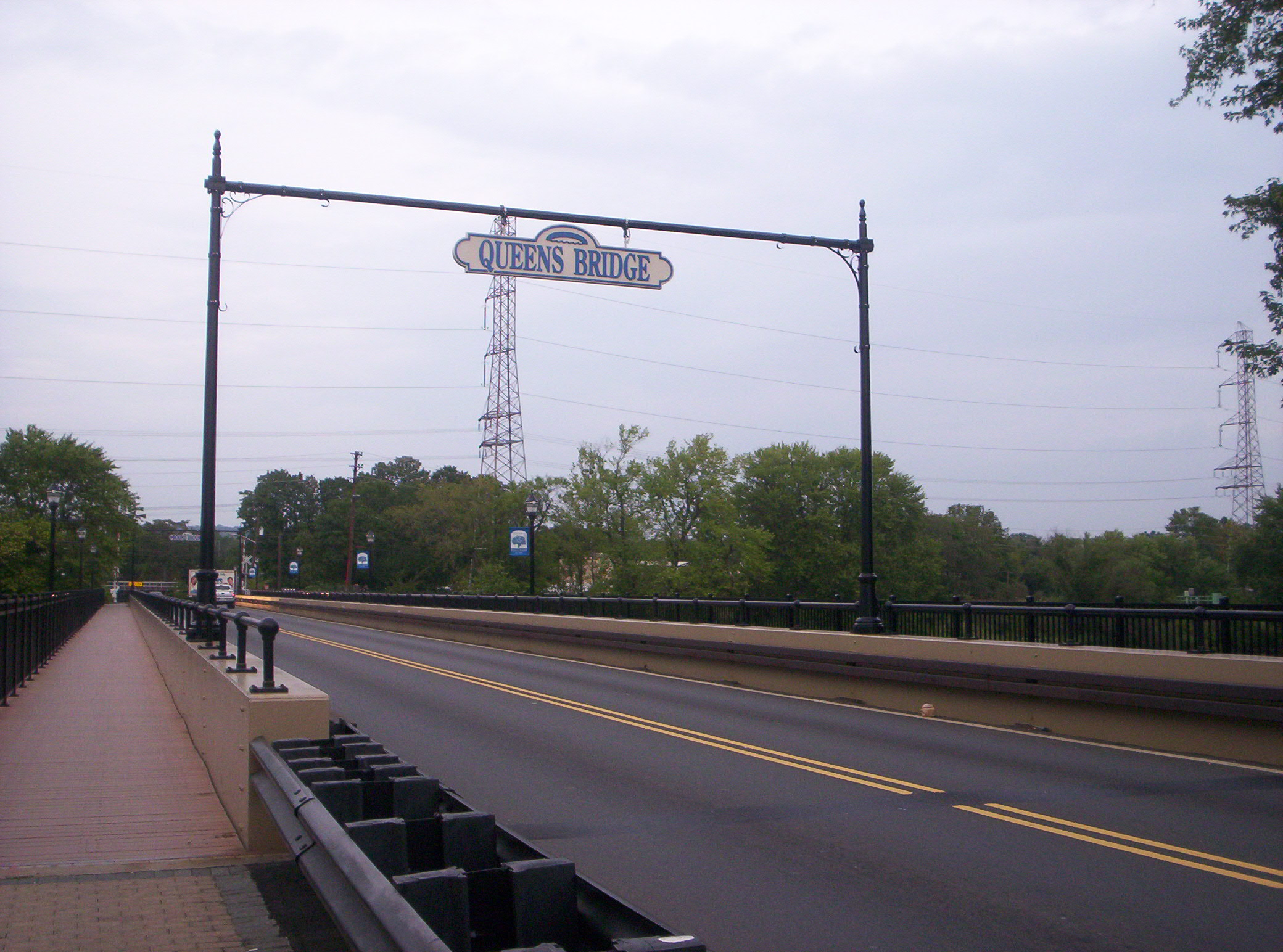
The Queen's Bridge, as seen from the South Bound Brook side.

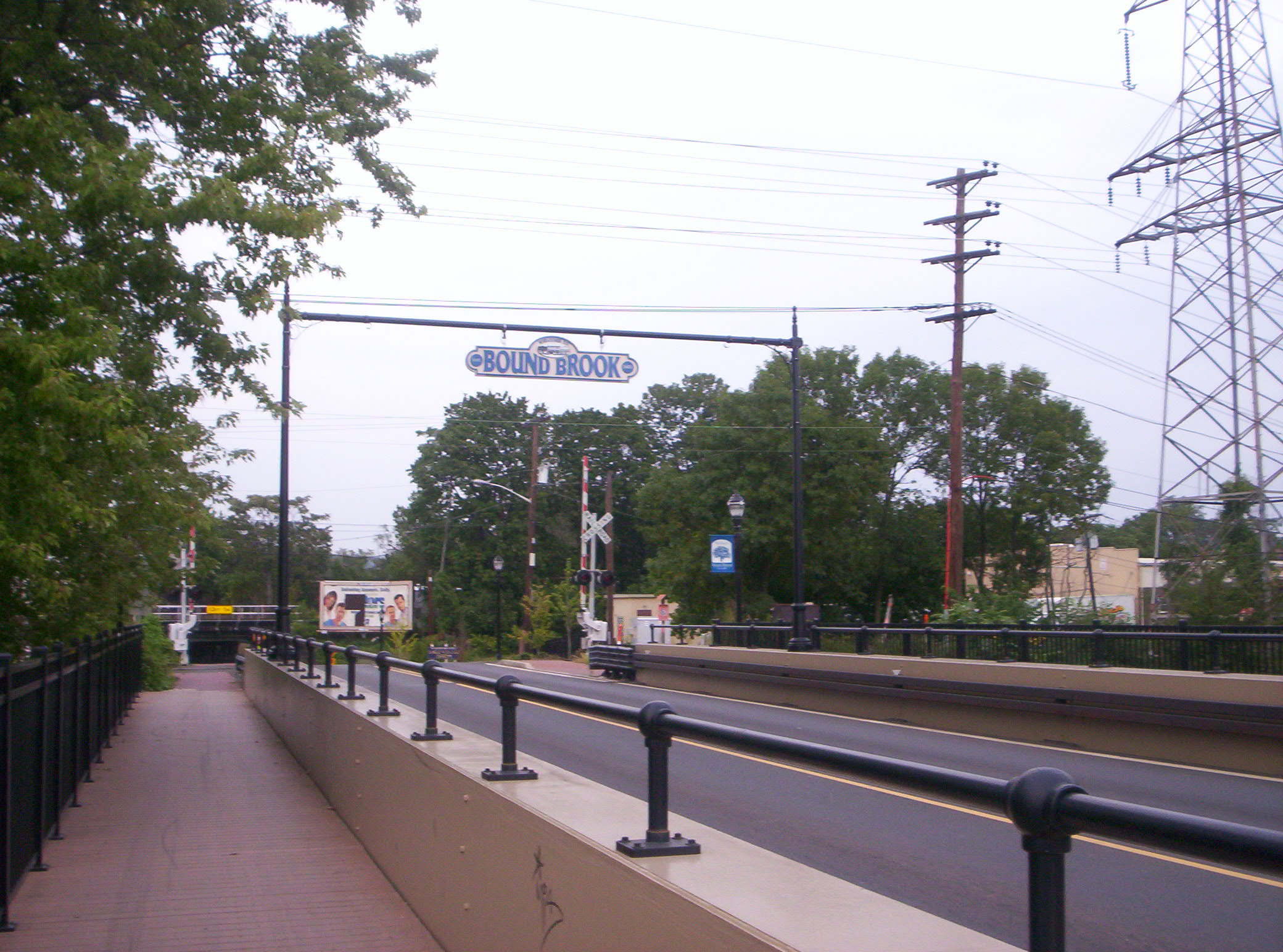
The Queen's Bridge, as seen looking into Bound Brook.
