= South Bound Brook, New Jersey =

Borough in Somerset County, New Jersey, US

- Borough
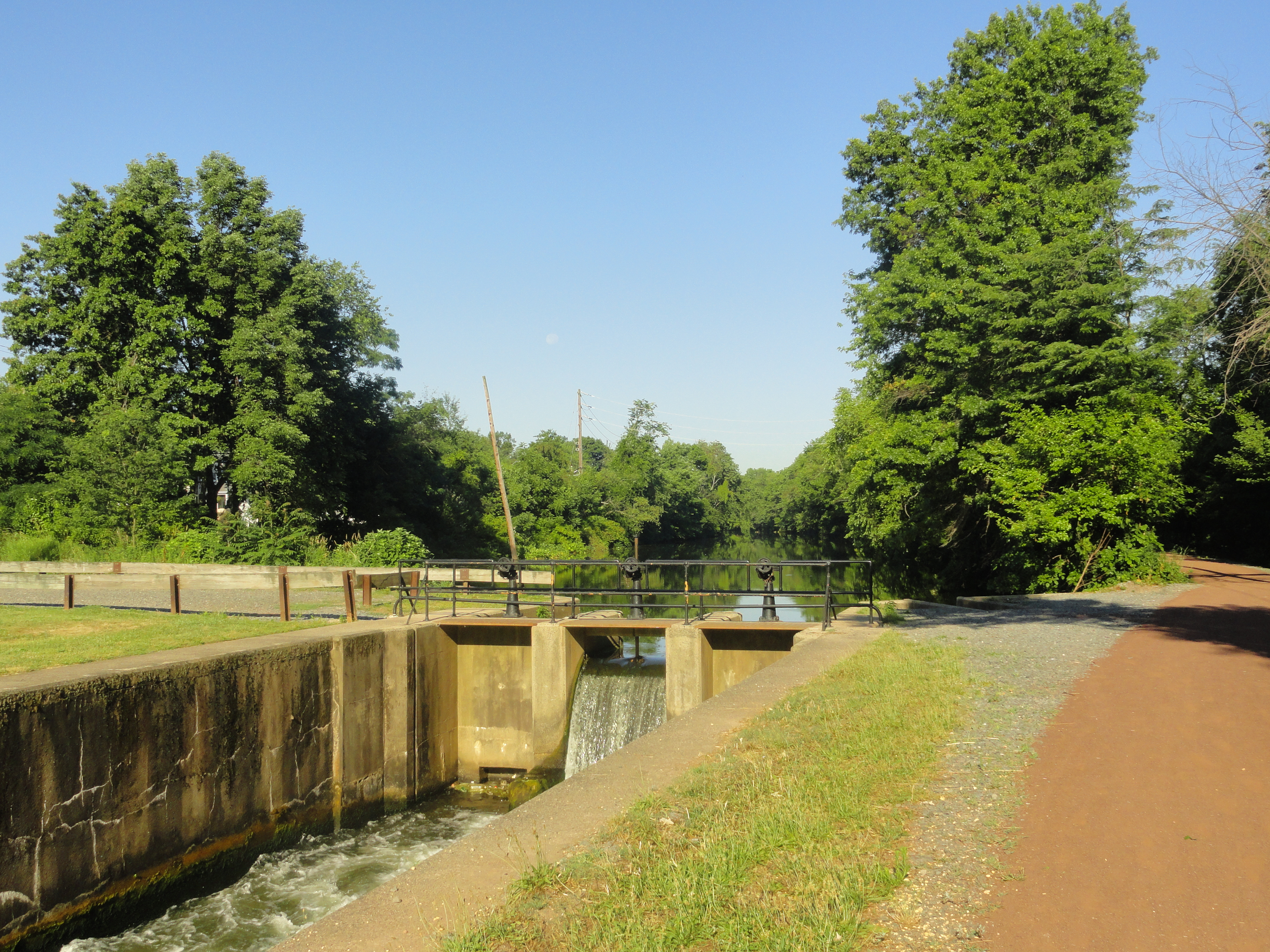
- Delaware and Raritan Canal locks

- Seal

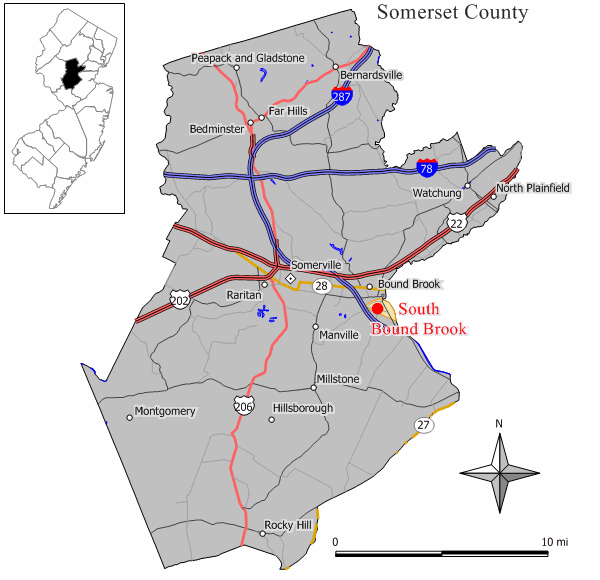
- Location of South Bound Brook in Somerset County highlighted in yellow (right). Inset map: Location of Somerset County in New Jersey highlighted in black (left).

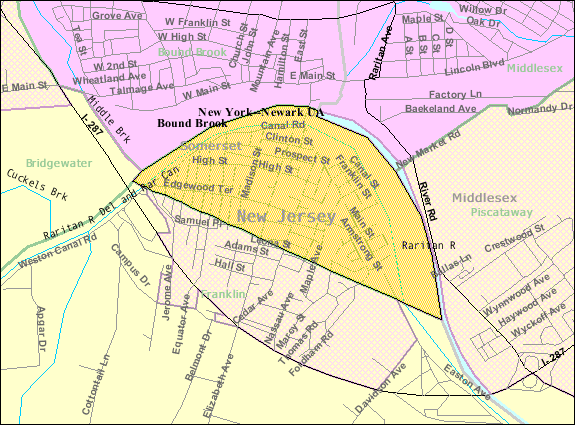
- Census Bureau map of South Bound Brook, New Jersey

- Location in Somerset County Location in New Jersey Location in the United States
- Coordinates: 40.553947°N 74.527455°W
- Country: United States
- State: New Jersey
- County: Somerset
- Formed: Unknown (within Franklin Township)
- Renamed: March 16, 1869 (as Bloomington Town)
- Renamed: May 29, 1891 (as South Bound Brook Town)
- Incorporated: May 1, 1907
- Named for: Bound Brook (Raritan River)

Government
  - Type: Borough
  - Body: Borough Council
  - Mayor: Caryl A. "Chris" Shoffner (D, term ends December 31, 2023)
  - Administrator: Christina Fischer
  - Municipal clerk: Christina Fischer

Area
  - Total: 0.74 sq mi (1.92 km^{2})
  - Land: 0.64 sq mi (1.67 km^{2})
  - Water: 0.097 sq mi (0.25 km^{2}) 12.84%
  - Rank: 526th of 565 in state 19th of 21 in county
- Elevation: 46 ft (14 m)

Population (2020)
  - Total: 4,863
  - Estimate (2023): 4,811
  - Rank: 382nd of 565 in state 17th of 21 in county
  - Density: 7,543.4/sq mi (2,912.5/km^{2})
  - Rank: 59th of 565 in state 2nd of 21 in county
- Time zone: UTC−05:00 (Eastern (EST))
  - Summer (DST): UTC−04:00 (Eastern (EDT))
- ZIP Code: 08880
- Area code: 732
- FIPS code: 3403568730
- GNIS feature ID: 885401
- Website: www.sbbnj.com

South Bound Brook is a borough in Somerset County, in the U.S. state of New Jersey. As of the 2020 United States census, the borough's population was 4,863, an increase of 300 (+6.6%) from the 2010 census count of 4,563, which in turn reflected an increase of 71 (+1.6%) from the 4,492 counted in the 2000 census.

What is now South Bound Brook was originally formed as a town within Franklin Township. On March 16, 1869, the name of the community was changed to Bloomington, which lasted until May 29, 1891, when the name reverted to South Bound Brook town. South Bound Brook was incorporated as an independent borough by an act of the New Jersey Legislature on April 11, 1907, based on the results of a referendum held on May 1, 1907.

== History ==
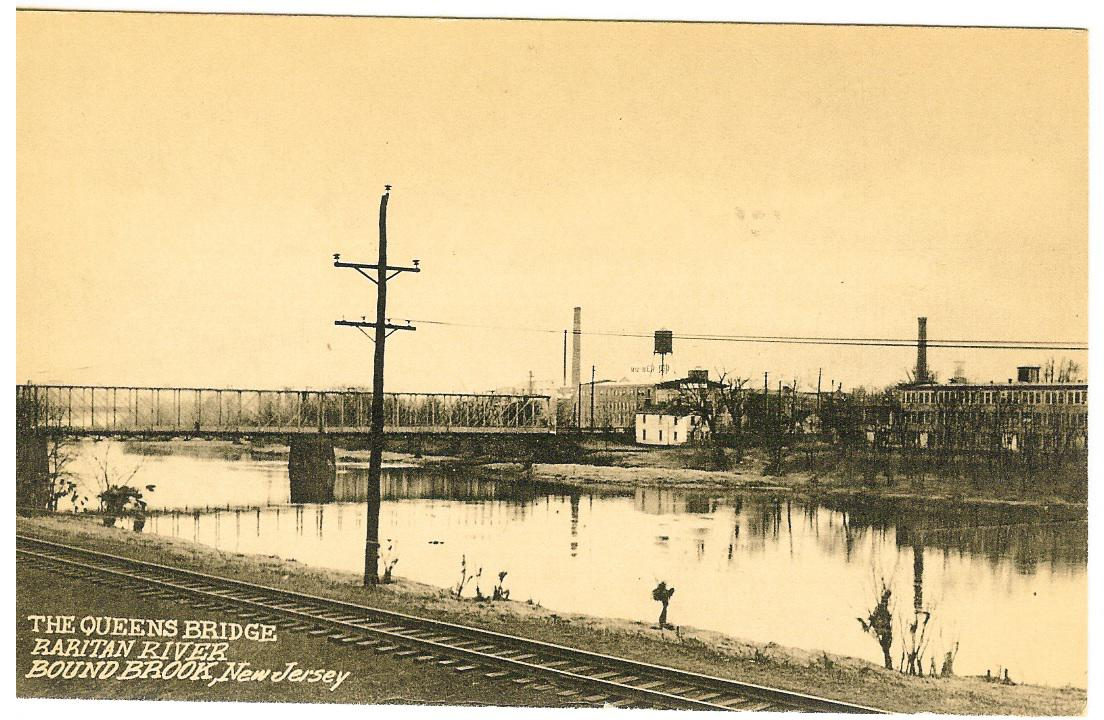
Queen's Bridge, South Bound Brook

The area had historically been occupied by the Lenape Native Americans. The first European settlement was in 1681 and a community was established near the Bound Brook stream of the same name, which flows into the Raritan River via the Green Brook on the eastern side of the borough. The brook, which was mentioned as a boundary in a Native American deed, provides the source of the borough's name.

The area was originally a Dutch community with apple orchards and just west peach orchards. The Abraham Staats House (c. 1740), located on the south side of Main Street, served as the headquarters of Baron Von Steuben during the American Revolutionary War. The house remained a private home until it was acquired by the Borough of South Bound Brook in 1999. It was placed on the New Jersey and National Registers in 2002. It is currently the headquarters for the Friends of Abraham Staats House, Inc. https://www.staatshouse.org, who maintain it as a museum.

A wooden bridge over the Raritan River was erected as early as 1761 and named Queen's Bridge in 1767. Later, it became a covered bridge. During the Revolutionary War, the bridge was used repeatedly by both sides including during the Battle of Bound Brook in 1777. In 1875, the wooden bridge was replaced by a steel pipe truss bridge. More than 100 years later, that bridge was itself replaced by a steel girder bridge in 1984, still using the old pillars. The bridge was renovated and paved in 2007.

At this spot on January 4, 1777, General Washington decided to move his troops to Morristown for the winter, thus ending the victorious Trenton-Princeton campaign, rather than attack New Brunswick.

The Battle of Bound Brook, one of the battles in the New York and New Jersey campaign during the American Revolutionary War, occurred on April 13, 1777, and resulted in a defeat for the Continental Army, who were routed by about 4,000 troops under British command.

At dawn on April 13, 1777, Hessian Captain Ewald's assault over the Queens Bridge spanning the Raritan River between South Bound Brook and Bound Brook was pinned down by "murderous fire" from the American soldiers stationed at half moon battery. Advancing North along present day Easton Avenue, Hessian Colonel Donop pushed aside American outposts and arrived 15 minutes after Ewald's attack had faltered. Advancing over the Queens Bridge, Donop's troops engaged the Americans causing them to retreat from the battery. Donop, Ewald's, and General Grant's troops pursued the American troops as they fought through the streets of Bound Brook.

The Reformed Church, also on Main Street (near borough hall) was built in 1848 and has been declared a local historical site by the borough council. Originally called the Dutch Reformed Church of Bound Brook, it has gone through very few changes over the years. A pipe organ received from Andrew Carnegie has been removed, and the stained glass windows, which had been added well after the original construction. The Reverend Thomas DeWitt Talmadge was a member and preached at the church.

Originally part of Franklin Township and named Bloomington, South Bound Brook was incorporated as a borough by the New Jersey Legislature in 1907.

In the mid-1970s a teen from the town created a plan for an environmental commission and presented it to the council. James Manley got his commission and the first order of business was to find out what the white piles of waste on the tow path between the Delaware and Raritan Canal and Raritan River consisted of. It turned out to be 17% crystal asbestos by volume. Since there was no New Jersey state regulation for the disposal, this became a landmark case. The waste was hauled in dump trucks through Bound Brook to the floodplain south of West Main Street and dumped. A trail of asbestos dust led from the old dump site to the new dump location.

=== Redevelopment ===
The main downtown street in South Bound Brook, known as Main Street, has been refurbished with new sidewalks, lighting, signage and a number of newly renovated stores.

A roofing material manufacturing facility known as GAF Manufacturing was located in South Bound Brook for over a century along Main Street. The site was dormant for about two decades and sat as an eyesore and reminder of the town's industrial past. New townhomes have been built on the GAF Manufacturing site, along the Delaware and Raritan Canal, which provide the downtown area a new modern look and many new residents.

Part of the redevelopment is being held up by a lawsuit by John Fanaro of Fanaro Carpeting over the right of eminent domain, as the borough tried to seize property along Main Street that is in front of the new townhomes. The redevelopment plan called for the older stores to be razed and replaced with new stores that had parking in back and a dozen rental apartments on the second floor.

A new condominium development along Elizabeth Street in the central part of town was finished in 2010.

== Geography ==
According to the United States Census Bureau, the borough had a total area of 0.74 square miles (1.92 km^{2}), including 0.65 square miles (1.67 km^{2}) of land and 0.10 square miles (0.25 km^{2}) of water (12.84%).

The borough borders the municipalities of Bound Brook, Bridgewater Township and Franklin Township in Somerset County, and both Middlesex Borough and Piscataway in Middlesex County.

== Demographics ==
Historical population
| Census | Pop. | Note | %± |
|---|---|---|---|
| 1880 | 671 | | — |
| 1890 | 801 | | 19.4% |
| 1900 | 883 | | 10.2% |
| 1910 | 1,024 | | 16.0% |
| 1920 | 1,302 | | 27.1% |
| 1930 | 1,763 | | 35.4% |
| 1940 | 1,928 | | 9.4% |
| 1950 | 2,905 | | 50.7% |
| 1960 | 3,626 | | 24.8% |
| 1970 | 4,525 | | 24.8% |
| 1980 | 4,331 | | −4.3% |
| 1990 | 4,185 | | −3.4% |
| 2000 | 4,492 | | 7.3% |
| 2010 | 4,563 | | 1.6% |
| 2020 | 4,863 | | 6.6% |
| 2023 (est.) | 4,811 | ▼ | −1.1% |
Population sources: 1880–1920 1880–1890; 1890–1910 1910–1930; 1940–2000 2000; 2010 2020

=== 2020 census ===
As of the 2020 census, South Bound Brook had a population of 4,863. The median age was 38.2 years. 19.5% of residents were under the age of 18 and 13.2% of residents were 65 years of age or older. For every 100 females there were 103.4 males, and for every 100 females age 18 and over there were 102.7 males age 18 and over.

100.0% of residents lived in urban areas, while 0.0% lived in rural areas.

There were 1,854 households in South Bound Brook, of which 30.2% had children under the age of 18 living in them. Of all households, 43.9% were married-couple households, 22.3% were households with a male householder and no spouse or partner present, and 26.6% were households with a female householder and no spouse or partner present. About 26.9% of all households were made up of individuals and 7.3% had someone living alone who was 65 years of age or older.

There were 1,941 housing units, of which 4.5% were vacant. The homeowner vacancy rate was 1.5% and the rental vacancy rate was 3.9%.

Racial composition as of the 2020 census
| Race | Number | Percent |
|---|---|---|
| White | 2,465 | 50.7% |
| Black or African American | 568 | 11.7% |
| American Indian and Alaska Native | 75 | 1.5% |
| Asian | 402 | 8.3% |
| Native Hawaiian and Other Pacific Islander | 1 | 0.0% |
| Some other race | 742 | 15.3% |
| Two or more races | 610 | 12.5% |
| Hispanic or Latino (of any race) | 1,537 | 31.6% |

=== 2010 census ===
The 2010 United States census counted 4,563 people, 1,733 households, and 1,120 families in the borough. The population density was 6,933.8 per square mile (2,677.2/km^{2}). There were 1,865 housing units at an average density of 2,834.0 per square mile (1,094.2/km^{2}). The racial makeup was 67.19% (3,066) White, 10.10% (461) Black or African American, 0.13% (6) Native American, 6.14% (280) Asian, 0.04% (2) Pacific Islander, 11.83% (540) from other races, and 4.56% (208) from two or more races. Hispanic or Latino of any race were 27.28% (1,245) of the population.

Of the 1,733 households, 30.1% had children under the age of 18; 45.0% were married couples living together; 13.1% had a female householder with no husband present and 35.4% were non-families. Of all households, 27.6% were made up of individuals and 6.5% had someone living alone who was 65 years of age or older. The average household size was 2.63 and the average family size was 3.22.

21.4% of the population were under the age of 18, 8.5% from 18 to 24, 33.6% from 25 to 44, 27.6% from 45 to 64, and 8.9% who were 65 years of age or older. The median age was 35.6 years. For every 100 females, the population had 105.3 males. For every 100 females ages 18 and older there were 102.4 males.

The Census Bureau's 2006–2010 American Community Survey showed that (in 2010 inflation-adjusted dollars) median household income was $78,427 (with a margin of error of +/− $6,959) and the median family income was $83,438 (+/− $13,065). Males had a median income of $61,042 (+/− $10,592) versus $44,063 (+/− $4,877) for females. The per capita income for the borough was $33,112 (+/− $3,774). About 1.0% of families and 1.8% of the population were below the poverty line, including none of those under age 18 and 8.0% of those age 65 or over.

=== 2000 census ===
As of the 2000 United States census there were 4,492 people, 1,632 households, and 1,103 families residing in the borough. The population density was 5,765.3 inhabitants per square mile (2,226.0/km^{2}). There were 1,676 housing units at an average density of 2U.S. Census, 151.1/sq mi (829.6/km^{2}). The racial makeup of the borough was 78.01% White, 7.77% African American, 0.27% Native American, 4.10% Asian, 0.04% Pacific Islander, 6.57% from other races, and 3.25% from two or more races. Hispanic or Latino of any race were 22.89% of the population.

There were 1,632 households, out of which 31.3% had children under the age of 18 living with them, 51.0% were married couples living together, 10.8% had a female householder with no husband present, and 32.4% were non-families. 25.1% of all households were made up of individuals, and 8.0% had someone living alone who was 65 years of age or older. The average household size was 2.75 and the average family size was 3.31.

In the borough the population was spread out, with 23.5% under the age of 18, 8.8% from 18 to 24, 36.2% from 25 to 44, 21.1% from 45 to 64, and 10.5% who were 65 years of age or older. The median age was 35 years. For every 100 females, there were 105.2 males. For every 100 females age 18 and over, there were 100.4 males.

The median income for a household in the borough was $48,984, and the median income for a family was $58,214. Males had a median income of $36,955 versus $30,082 for females. The per capita income for the borough was $21,131. About 3.6% of families and 6.7% of the population were below the poverty line, including 5.5% of those under age 18 and 10.1% of those age 65 or over.

== Parks and recreation ==
The main attraction in South Bound Brook is the Delaware and Raritan Canal, which forms the northern and eastern boundaries of the town. The canal and its D&R Canal Trail are used for numerous recreational purposes from light boating to hiking and biking. Also of note is the Raritan River which lies on the far side of the canal and provides further recreational opportunities such as boating and fishing. The Queens Bridge crosses the canal and river, connecting to Bound Brook.

The Raritan River Greenway is a proposed path that would link Branchburg Township to the East Coast Greenway with the Delaware and Raritan Canal trail in South Bound Brook.

== Government ==
=== Local government ===
South Bound Brook is governed under the borough form of New Jersey municipal government, which is used in 218 municipalities (of the 564) statewide, making it the most common form of government in New Jersey. The governing body is comprised of the mayor and the borough council, with all positions elected at-large on a partisan basis as part of the November general election. The mayor is elected directly by the voters to a four-year term of office. The borough council includes six members elected to serve three-year terms on a staggered basis, with two seats coming up for election each year in a three-year cycle. The borough form of government used by South Bound Brook is a "weak mayor / strong council" government in which council members act as the legislative body with the mayor presiding at meetings and voting only in the event of a tie. The mayor can veto ordinances subject to an override by a two-thirds majority vote of the council. The mayor makes committee and liaison assignments for council members, and most appointments are made by the mayor with the advice and consent of the council.

As of 2022, the mayor of South Bound Brook is Democrat Caryl A. "Chris" Shoffner, whose term of office ends on December 31, 2023. Members of the Borough Council are Council President Richard Eickhorst (D, 2023), Kathleen Connor (D, 2022), Anne Dedousis (D, 2023; appointed to serve an unexpired term), Kathryn M. "Katie" Kelly (R, 2022), Elizabeth Konkle (D, 2024) and Jitendra "Jimmy" Shah (D, 2024).

In February 2022, the borough council appointed Anne Dedousis to fill the seat expiring in December 2023 that had been held by Elizabeth Chu until she resigned from office the previous month.

In August 2015, the borough council selected Kathryn M. Kelly from three candidates nominated by the Republican municipal committee to fill the seat expiring in December 2016 that had been held by James Holmes until he resigned from office the previous month as he was moving out of the borough. Kelly served on an interim basis until the November 2015 general election, when she was elected to serve the one year remaining on the term of office.

==== Political corruption ====
In 2005, Republican mayor Jo-Anne Shubert resigned as Mayor of South Bound Brook a week before admitting that she had given a $35,000 no-bid computer contract to a company owned by her brother and where she was employed as an office manager.

In 2010 and 2011, Republican mayor Terry Warrelmann, was involved in a controversy involving his family and the borough's refusal to release police reports surrounding the incident. On July 9, 2010, John Paff, filed a lawsuit seeking the release of the documents. On December 17, 2010, New Jersey Superior Court Assignment Judge Yolanda Ciccone, sitting in Somerville, New Jersey, conducted a hearing on Paff's lawsuit. On March 31, 2011, Paff received a 79-page file containing the redacted versions of documents within that investigative file. The records show that Mayor Warrelmann, along with his son Stephen, Nancy Santora and an unidentified juvenile, were suspects in an investigation of a November 21, 2009, burglary of a shed in South Bound Brook. No charges, however, were brought against any of the suspects.

=== Federal, state, and county representation ===
South Bound Brook is located in the 12th Congressional District and is part of New Jersey's 17th state legislative district.

For the 119th United States Congress, New Jersey's 12th congressional district is represented by Bonnie Watson Coleman (D, Ewing Township). New Jersey is represented in the United States Senate by Democrats Cory Booker (Newark, term ends 2027) and Andy Kim (Moorestown, term ends 2031).

For the 2026–2027 session, the 17th legislative district of the New Jersey Legislature is represented in the State Senate by Bob Smith (D, Piscataway) and in the General Assembly by Joseph Danielsen (D, Franklin Township) and Kevin Egan (D, New Brunswick).

Somerset County is governed by a five-member Board of County Commissioners, whose members are elected at-large to three-year terms of office on a staggered basis, with one or two seats coming up for election each year. At an annual reorganization meeting held in the first week of January, the board selects a Director and deputy director from among its members. As of 2025, Somerset County's County Commissioners are Director Shanel Robinson (D, Franklin Township, term as commissioner ends 2027; term as director ends 2026), Deputy Director Paul Drake (D, Hillsborough Township, term as commissioner and as deputy director ends 2026), Melonie Marano (D, Green Brook Township, 2028), Elizabeth Graner (D, Bernards Township, 2026; elected to serve an unexpired term) and Sara Sooy (D, Bedminster Township, 2027).

Constitutional officers, elected on a countywide basis are Clerk Steve Peter (D, Somerville, 2027), Sheriff Darrin Russo (D, Franklin Township, 2028) and Surrogate Bernice "Tina" Jalloh (D, Franklin Township, 2030).

=== Politics ===
As of March 2011, there were a total of 2,354 registered voters in South Bound Brook, of whom 655 (27.8% vs. 26.0% countywide) were registered as Democrats, 452 (19.2% vs. 25.7%) were registered as Republicans and 1,247 (53.0% vs. 48.2%) were registered as Unaffiliated. There were no voters registered to other parties. Among the borough's 2010 Census population, 51.6% (vs. 60.4% in Somerset County) were registered to vote, including 65.6% of those ages 18 and over (vs. 80.4% countywide).

United States presidential election results for South Bound Brook
| Year | Republican | | Democratic | | Third party(ies) | |
| Year | No. | % | No. | % | No. | % |
|---|---|---|---|---|---|---|
| 2024 | 858 | 43.29% | 1,060 | 53.48% | 64 | 3.23% |
| 2020 | 808 | 38.06% | 1,266 | 59.63% | 49 | 2.31% |
| 2016 | 756 | 41.22% | 985 | 53.71% | 93 | 5.07% |
| 2012 | 627 | 37.98% | 1,001 | 60.63% | 23 | 1.39% |
| 2008 | 725 | 42.30% | 961 | 56.07% | 28 | 1.63% |
| 2004 | 744 | 51.67% | 679 | 47.15% | 17 | 1.18% |
| 2000 | 570 | 43.78% | 688 | 52.84% | 44 | 3.38% |

In the 2012 presidential election, Democrat Barack Obama received 60.6% of the vote (1,001 cast), ahead of Republican Mitt Romney with 38.0% (627 votes), and other candidates with 1.4% (23 votes), among the 1,664 ballots cast by the borough's 2,531 registered voters (13 ballots were spoiled), for a turnout of 65.7%. In the 2008 presidential election, Democrat Barack Obama received 961 votes (55.4% vs. 52.1% countywide), ahead of Republican John McCain with 725 votes (41.8% vs. 46.1%) and other candidates with 28 votes (1.6% vs. 1.1%), among the 1,735 ballots cast by the borough's 2,233 registered voters, for a turnout of 77.7% (vs. 78.7% in Somerset County). In the 2004 presidential election, Republican George W. Bush received 744 votes (51.3% vs. 51.5% countywide), ahead of Democrat John Kerry with 679 votes (46.8% vs. 47.2%) and other candidates with 17 votes (1.2% vs. 0.9%), among the 1,450 ballots cast by the borough's 1,882 registered voters, for a turnout of 77.0% (vs. 81.7% in the whole county).

Gubernatorial election results for South Bound Brook
| Year | Republican | | Democratic | | Third party(ies) | |
| Year | No. | % | No. | % | No. | % |
|---|---|---|---|---|---|---|
| 2025 | 582 | 37.65% | 944 | 61.06% | 20 | 1.29% |
| 2021 | 545 | 48.70% | 561 | 50.13% | 13 | 1.16% |
| 2017 | 469 | 46.25% | 508 | 50.10% | 37 | 3.65% |
| 2013 | 636 | 67.02% | 294 | 30.98% | 19 | 2.00% |
| 2009 | 630 | 56.60% | 371 | 33.33% | 112 | 10.06% |
| 2005 | 478 | 49.28% | 415 | 42.78% | 77 | 7.94% |

In the 2013 gubernatorial election, Republican Chris Christie received 67.0% of the vote (636 cast), ahead of Democrat Barbara Buono with 31.0% (294 votes), and other candidates with 2.0% (19 votes), among the 962 ballots cast by the borough's 2,583 registered voters (13 ballots were spoiled), for a turnout of 37.2%. In the 2009 gubernatorial election, Republican Chris Christie received 630 votes (56.0% vs. 55.8% countywide), ahead of Democrat Jon Corzine with 371 votes (32.9% vs. 34.1%), Independent Chris Daggett with 102 votes (9.1% vs. 8.7%) and other candidates with 10 votes (0.9% vs. 0.7%), among the 1,126 ballots cast by the borough's 2,337 registered voters, yielding a 48.2% turnout (vs. 52.5% in the county).

United States Senate election results for South Bound Brook1
| Year | Republican | | Democratic | | Third party(ies) | |
| Year | No. | % | No. | % | No. | % |
|---|---|---|---|---|---|---|
| 2024 | 770 | 41.60% | 1,011 | 54.62% | 70 | 3.78% |
| 2018 | 628 | 44.35% | 717 | 50.64% | 71 | 5.01% |
| 2012 | 590 | 37.65% | 946 | 60.37% | 31 | 1.98% |
| 2006 | 461 | 45.28% | 500 | 49.12% | 57 | 5.60% |

United States Senate election results for South Bound Brook2
| Year | Republican | | Democratic | | Third party(ies) | |
| Year | No. | % | No. | % | No. | % |
|---|---|---|---|---|---|---|
| 2020 | 783 | 37.46% | 1,261 | 60.33% | 46 | 2.20% |
| 2014 | 398 | 47.27% | 422 | 50.12% | 22 | 2.61% |
| 2013 | 277 | 50.55% | 261 | 47.63% | 10 | 1.82% |
| 2008 | 685 | 43.27% | 833 | 52.62% | 65 | 4.11% |

== Education ==
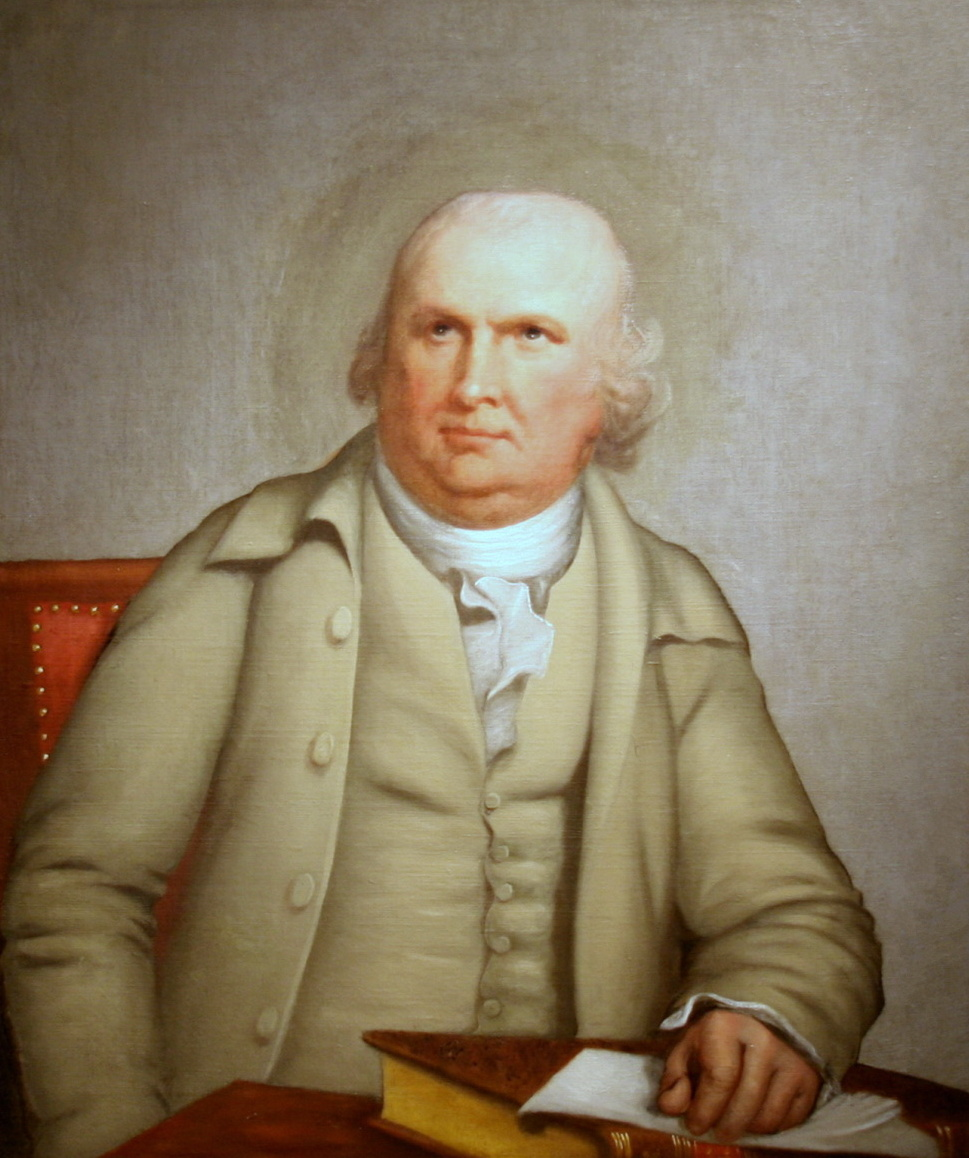
Robert Morris

The South Bound Brook School District serves public school students in pre-kindergarten through eighth grade at Robert Morris School, named after Robert Morris, a financier of the American Revolution. As of the 2020–21 school year, the district, comprised of one school, had an enrollment of 425 students and 37.0 classroom teachers (on an FTE basis), for a student–teacher ratio of 11.5:1.

For ninth through twelfth grades, public school students attend Bound Brook High School in Bound Brook, as part of a sending/receiving relationship with the Bound Brook School District. As of the 2020–21 school year, the high school had an enrollment of 652 students and 48.5 classroom teachers (on an FTE basis), for a student–teacher ratio of 13.4:1.

== Emergency services ==
The South Bound Brook Police Department is a 13-person department consisting of one Chief, two Lieutenants, two Sergeants, and eight officers on patrol. The Chief is Jeff Titus. The police department does not have its own dispatchers; South Bound Brook currently uses Somerset County Communications for all 9-1-1 and non-emergency calls.

The South Bound Brook Fire Department has been in existence for over 100 years. They currently have four pieces of apparatus at their Edgewood Terrace Headquarters: One E-One engine, one E-One 75-foot ladder, a new Seagrave rescue-pumper, and one Chevy Suburban for a chief's vehicle. Their chief is currently Sean Lambertz.

The South Bound Brook First Aid Squad was incorporated by their current name, then in 1990 became South Bound Brook/Franklin Township Rescue Squad. In 2002 the service area was cut back to just South Bound Brook, and the squad's name reverted to South Bound Brook First Aid Squad. The squad operates two ambulances from their Garfield Avenue headquarters, two Ford Type III Ambulances. The squad's water rescue and extrication equipment was sold after the 2002 change. The Chief of the South Bound Brook First Aid Squad is Wendy Franzishen. The squad responds to calls for EMS service on nights and weekends. Somerset Medical Center EMS Units take calls in South Bound Brook during the workday and weekends due to lack of volunteer personnel available.

The South Bound Brook Office of Emergency Management was originally the Civil Defense Board, and then briefly called Disaster Control in the 1990s, the Office of Emergency Management is charged with Emergency Preparedness and Planning. They are also responsible for the emergency operations plan, which is updated yearly by all departments of the borough. During major emergencies, they play a significant role in recovery efforts. They are also charged with borough compliance in the National Incident Management System. The Emergency Management Director/Coordinator is Michael D. Allenovitch.

== Points of interest ==
The Abraham Staats House was built c. 1740 and served as the headquarters for General Baron von Steuben in 1779 during the second Middlebrook encampment of the American Revolutionary War. The house was added to the National Register of Historic Places in 2002, and noted as representing "one of the finest remaining buildings from the second phase of Dutch immigration and settlement in the Raritan Valley".

Ukrainian Orthodox Church of the USA is headquartered in South Bound Brook. St. Sophia Ukrainian Orthodox Theological Seminary, St. Andrew's Memorial Church, and a large Ukrainian Orthodox cemetery right behind the church, where graves of many politicians from the Ukrainian People's Republic era can be visited, are located on the south side of the town.

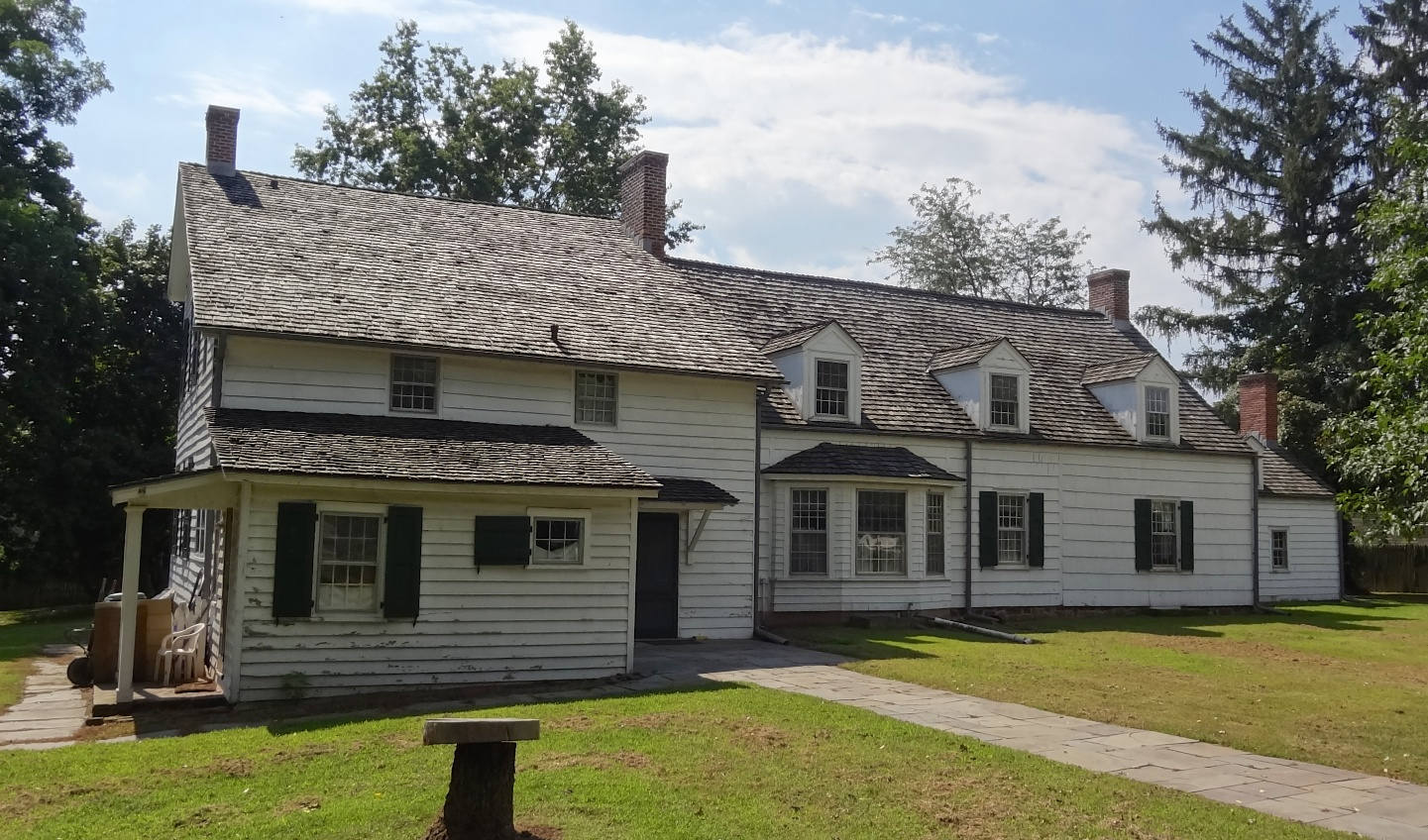
Abraham Staats House

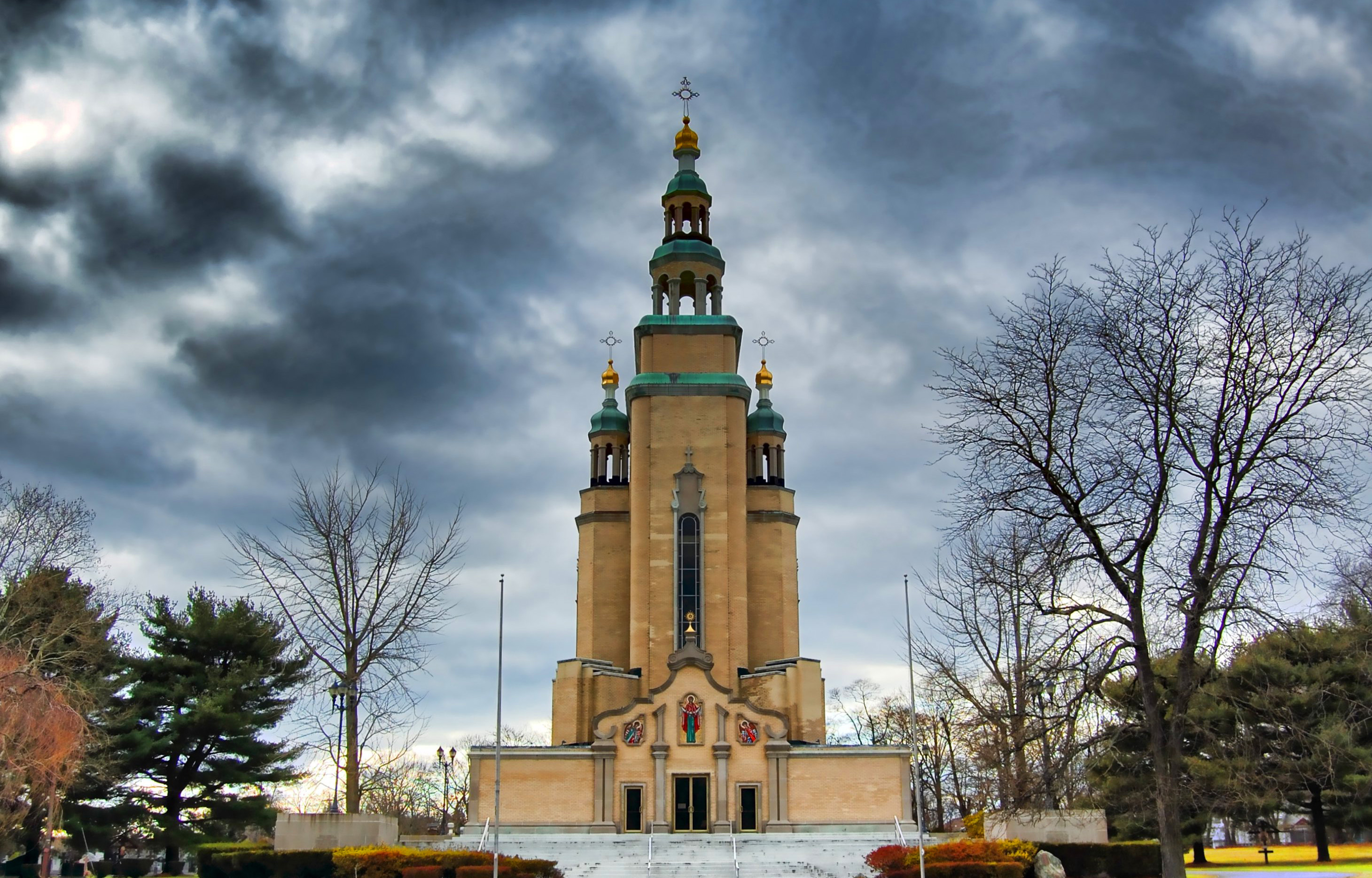
St. Andrew Memorial Church was built as a memorial honoring victims of the Holodomor and serves as the headquarters of the Ukrainian Orthodox Church of the USA.

== Flooding issues ==
While South Bound Brook does not have the legacy of flooding that its sister town Bound Brook on the north bank of the Raritan River has, flooding can be a problem in South Bound Brook during major river flooding events, such as a 100-year flood event. In September 1999, the remnants of Hurricane Floyd caused a record flood crest on the Raritan River. While escaping the worst flooding, due to its elevated perch above the Raritan River, South Bound Brook did experience flood waters in the two- to three-foot range near the canal, including in portions of the downtown area along Main Street.

== Transportation ==
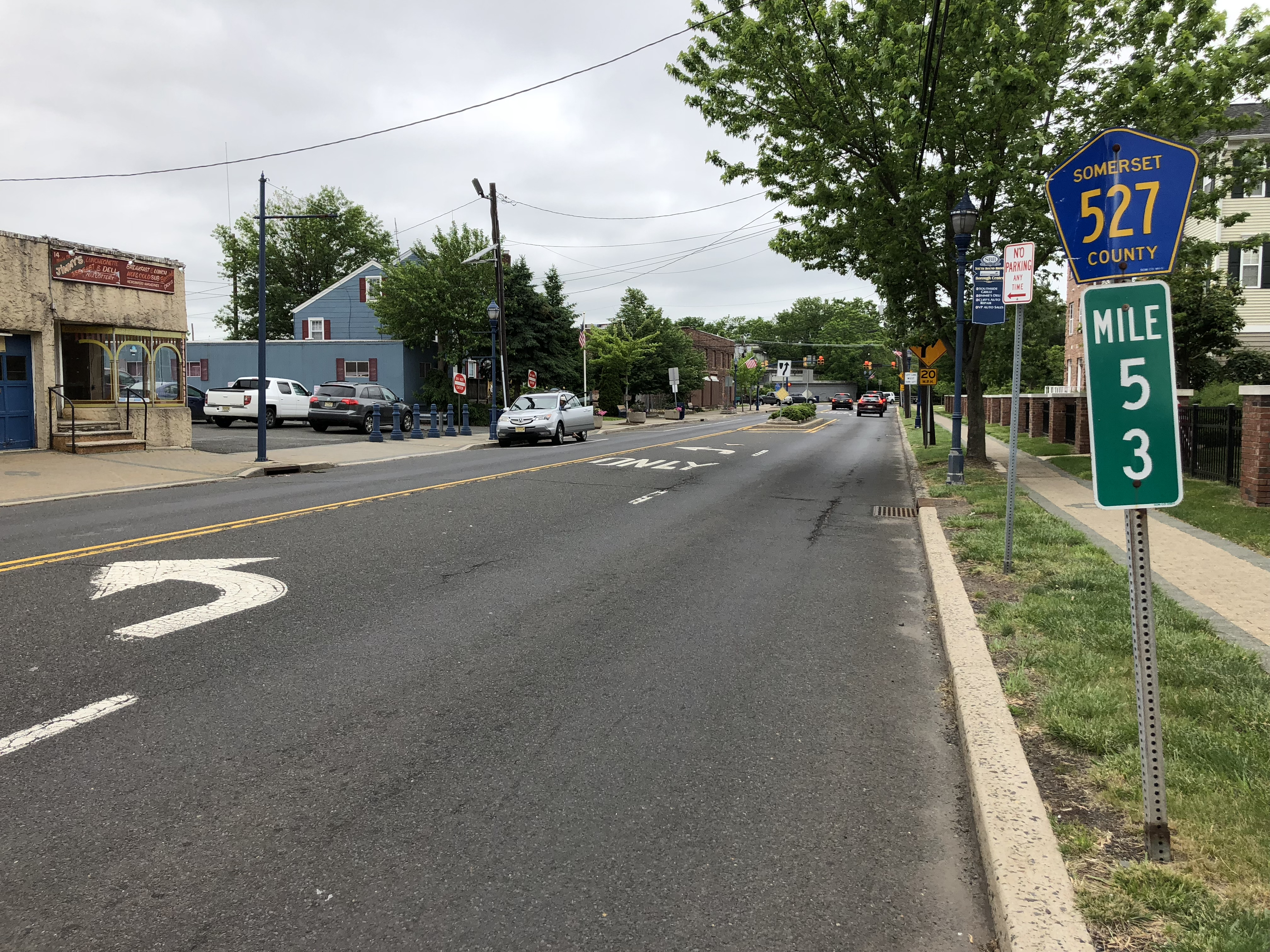
County Route 527 in South Bound Brook, the most significant highway in the borough

=== Roads and highways ===
As of May 2010, the borough had a total of 12.51 miles (20.13 km) of roadways, of which 9.01 miles (14.50 km) were maintained by the municipality and 3.50 miles (5.63 km) by Somerset County.

County Route 527 is the most significant road to pass through South Bound Brook. Interstate 287, which provides access and connections to large parts of New Jersey and New York City, passes just to the southwest of South Bound Brook in Franklin Township, with two interchanges providing quick access to South Bound Brook.

=== Public transportation ===
NJ Transit provides frequent train service on the Raritan Valley Line to/from Penn Station Newark and Penn Station New York via the nearby Bound Brook Train Station, which is about a five- to ten-minute walk from downtown South Bound Brook.

NJ Transit bus service to and from the Port Authority Bus Terminal in Midtown Manhattan is provided on the 114 and 117 routes, with service to Newark available on the 65 bus line.

== Notable people ==
People who were born in, residents of, or otherwise closely associated with South Bound Brook include:

- Heidi Bohay (born 1959), actress and television host
- Thomas H. Caffrey (born 1893), Wisconsin State Assemblyman
- Tunis Craven (1813–1864), commanding officer of the USS Tecumseh, an iron-hulled, single-turret monitor, commissioned in 1864 and sunk in the Battle of Mobile Bay. After being hit by a torpedo (actually moored mines) the Tecumseh began to heel rapidly; and men scrambled to abandon ship. Comdr. Craven arrived at the foot of the ladder leading to the main deck simultaneously with the pilot, John Collins. Craven stepped back, saying "After you, pilot," thus permitting Collins to escape. His gallantry cost Craven his life, for the ship sank in a frightfully fast 25 seconds. Resident of South Bound Brook from approximately 1844–1864
- Thomas De Witt Talmage (1832–1902), preacher, clergyman and divine, who was a member of the Reformed Church on Main Street in South Bound Brook
