= Ovruchsky Uyezd =

- Uezd
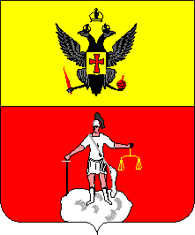
- Coat of arms

- Location in the Volhynian Governorate
- Country: Russian Empire
- Governorate: Poltava
- Established: 1781
- Abolished: 1923
- Capital: Ovruch

Population (1897)
  - Total: 205,390

Ovruchsky Uyezd (Овручский уезд) was one of the subdivisions of the Volhynian Governorate of the Russian Empire. It was situated in the northeastern part of the governorate. Its administrative centre was Ovruch.

== Demographics ==
At the time of the Russian Empire Census of 1897, Ovruchsky Uyezd had a population of 205,390. Of these, 83.4% spoke Ukrainian, 10.6% Yiddish, 2.6% Russian, 1.3% Polish, 1.2% German, 0.5% Belarusian and 0.3% Czech as their native language.
