= Bound Brook =

Bound Brook may refer to:

- Bound Brook, New Jersey, a borough in Somerset County
  - Battle of Bound Brook
  - Bound Brook (NJT station), a railroad station in the above borough
- Bound Brook (Raritan River), a tributary of Green Brook in central New Jersey
- Bound Brook (Barnstable County, Massachusetts), a river located by Wellfleet, Massachusetts
- Bound Brook (Massachusetts river), a small river flowing through South Shore (Massachusetts)
