= Crab Brook =

Stream in New Jersey, United States

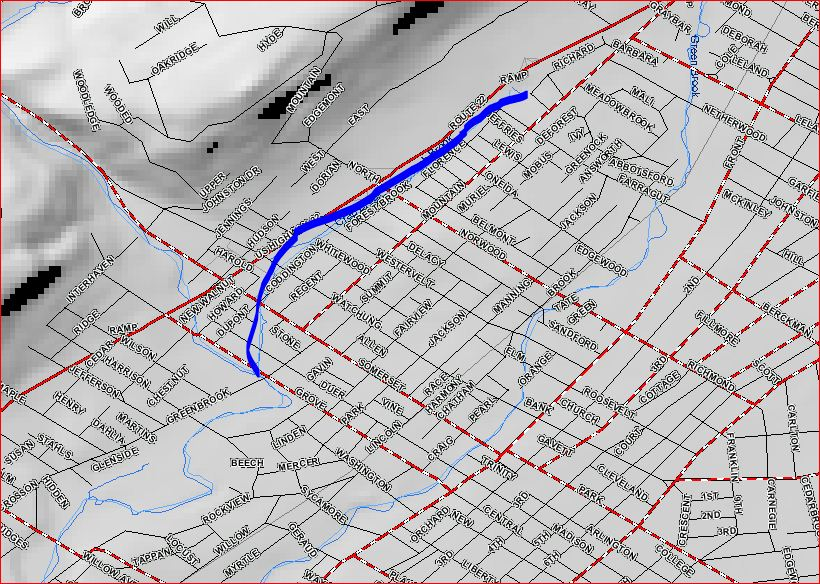
- Map of Crab Brook

Location
- Country: United States

Physical characteristics
- Source
  - coordinates: 40°38′11″N 74°25′27″W
- Mouth
  - coordinates: 40°37′20″N 74°26′8″W
  - elevation: 75 ft (23 m)

Basin features
- Progression: Stony Brook, Green Brook, Bound Brook, Raritan River, Atlantic Ocean

Crab Brook is a tributary of Stony Brook in central New Jersey in the United States.

== Course ==
Crab Brook starts at 40°38′11″N 74°25′27″W, near Watchung Square. It flows southwest, crossing North Drive, Watchung Avenue, and Somerset Street, before draining into Stony Brook at 40°37′20″N 74°26′8″W, near Greenbrook Road.

== See also ==
- List of rivers of New Jersey
