= Stony Brook (Green Brook tributary) =

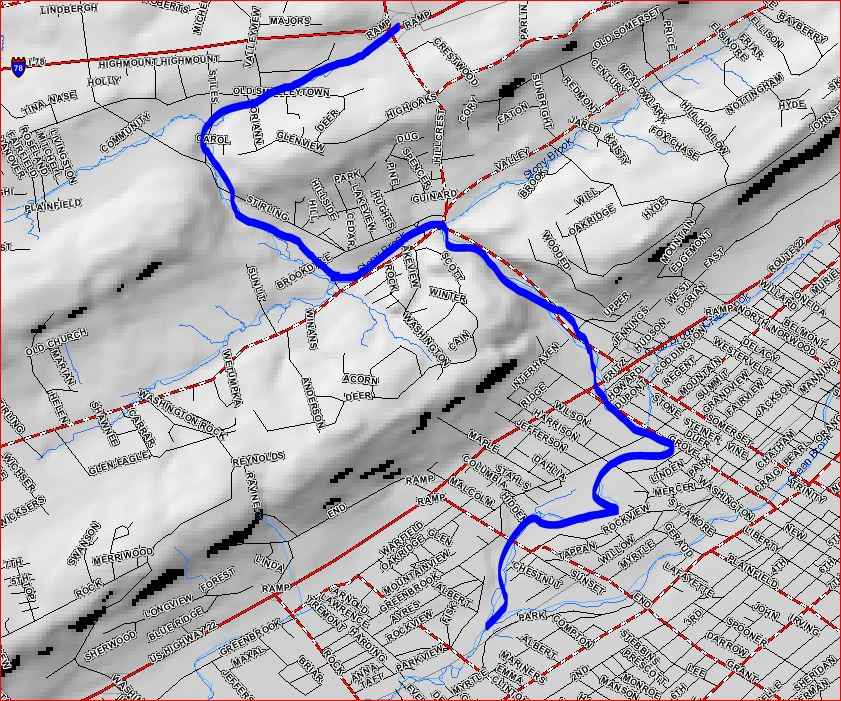
- Stony Brook map

Location
- Country: United States

Physical characteristics
- Source
  - location: near Watchung, New Jersey
  - coordinates: 40°39′12″N 74°27′11″W
- Mouth
  - location: North Plainfield, New Jersey
  - coordinates: 40°36′28″N 74°26′52″W
  - elevation: 59 ft (18 m)

Basin features
- Progression: Green Brook, Bound Brook, Raritan River
- River system: Raritan River system
- Tributaries
  - right: Crab Brook

Stony Brook is a tributary of Green Brook in Somerset County, central New Jersey in the United States.

== Course ==
The Stony Brook starts at 40°39′12″N 74°27′11″W just outside of Watchung, New Jersey, near the intersection of Hillcrest Road and I-78. It flows southeast, crossing Stirling Road, before turning southwest. It then turns northeast and flows into Watchung Lake. In Watchung Lake, it joins an unnamed tributary from the northeast and another one from the southwest. It then leaves the lake and goes southeast through the town of Watchung. It passes through the Stony Brook Gorge in the first Watchung Mountain and over the Wetumpka Falls.

Entering North Plainfield, New Jersey, it crosses Route 22 and joins the Crab Brook. It then crosses Greenbrook Road and turns south. It ultimately crosses West End Avenue and drains into the Green Brook at 40°36′28″N 74°26′52″W, in the Green Brook Park on the Plainfield, New Jersey town line.

== Tributaries ==
- Crab Brook is the only tributary.

== See also ==
- Stony Brook (Millstone River)
- List of rivers of New Jersey
