= All Souls Church (Plainfield, New Jersey) =

- U.S. National Register of Historic Places
- New Jersey Register of Historic Places
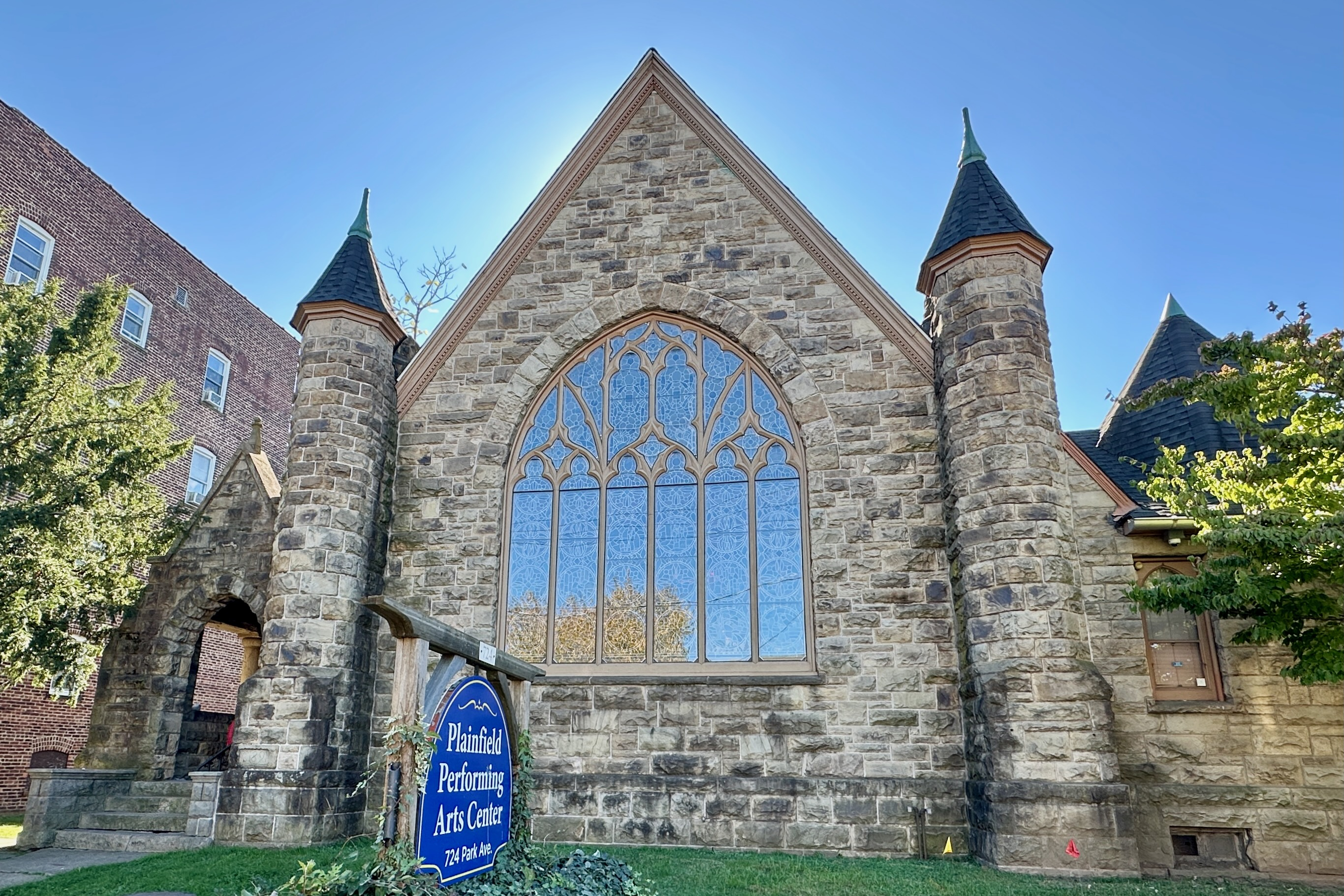
- Plainfield Performing Arts Center in 2024

- Location within Union County, New Jersey Location within New Jersey Location within the United States
- Location: 724 Park Avenue, Plainfield, New Jersey
- Coordinates: 40°36′51″N 74°24′58″W
- Built: 1892
- Architect: Oscar Schutte Teale, Josiah T. Tubby, Harry Keith White
- Architectural style: Romanesque, Late Gothic Revival
- NRHP reference No.: 09001078
- NJRHP No.: 2656

Significant dates
- Added to NRHP: December 11, 2009
- Designated NJRHP: June 25, 2007

All Souls Church, also known as the First Unitarian Society of Plainfield, is located at 724 Park Avenue in the city of Plainfield in Union County, New Jersey, United States. Built in 1892, the historic stone church was added to the National Register of Historic Places on December 11, 2009, for its significance in architecture and religion. It is now the home of the Plainfield Performing Arts Center (PPAC).

The church was designed in 1892 by the architect and magician Oscar Schutte Teale and features Romanesque and Late Gothic Revival architecture. He also designed the Presbyterian Church at Bound Brook in 1896 and the Old Main at Centenary University in 1901. The Parish House was added in 1922, designed by the architect Josiah T. Tubby. The architect Harry Keith White redesigned the interior of the church in 1929.

== See also ==
- National Register of Historic Places listings in Union County, New Jersey
