= Mountain View, New Jersey =

Mountain View, New Jersey may refer to the following places in New Jersey:

- Mountainview, Mercer County, New Jersey, an unincorporated community in Ewing
- Mountain View, Passaic County, New Jersey, an unincorporated community in Wayne
- Mountain View Park (New Jersey), a park in Middlesex
- Mountain View (NJT station), a New Jersey Transit train station in Wayne
