= Mountain View Park (New Jersey) =

Public park in New Jersey

Mountain View Park is a large park in Middlesex, Middlesex County, New Jersey, that surrounds Middlesex High School. The main road in and out of the park is Route 28 / Bound Brook Road.

Bound Brook joins the Green Brook at the northwest corner of Mountain View Park. The brook then flows south before the Ambrose Brook joins it near Lincoln Boulevard. It then flows into the Raritan River in Middlesex at an elevation of 19 feet.

== Facilities ==
Public facilities in Mountain View Park include:

- Two gazebos
- Two playgrounds
- Horseshoe pits
- Numerous basketball courts
- Numerous tennis courts
- Middlesex Community Pool
- Memorial Field
- Model-airplane strip
- Barbecue grills
- Numerous park benches
- Baseball field
- Softball field
- Three soccer fields
