= Catholic Societies =

Catholic Societies may refer to:

- Catholic societies of the Church of England, societies promoting Anglo-Catholicism within the Church of England and the Anglican Communion.
- American Federation of Catholic Societies, a Roman Catholic association in the United States of America, active from 1901 to 1917.
