= Green Brook Flood Control Project =

The Green Brook Flood Control Project is a flood control project in Somerset County in central New Jersey first proposed in the early 1970s in the wake of two major flooding events: a 1971 flood event and a major 1973 flood which ravaged the Green Brook and Raritan River basins, causing millions in property damage and several deaths in central New Jersey.

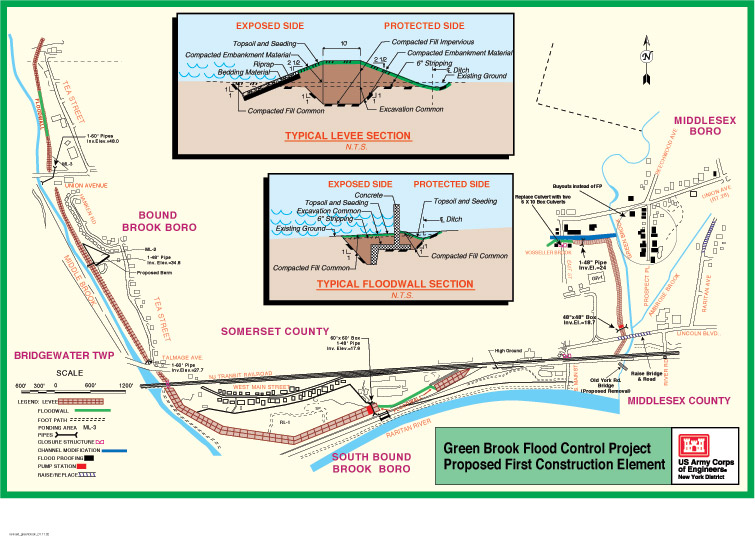
The proposed flood control measures in Bound Brook, New Jersey

The worst flooding in the Green Brook basin occurs in Bound Brook, which partially lies on a natural flood plain of the Raritan River at the junction of the Green Brook and Raritan River.

To address this flooding problem, the United States Army Corps of Engineers has proposed the Green Brook Sub Basin Flood Control Project, which entails numerous flood walls, levees, channel diversions, widening projects and retention basins throughout the Green Brook basin.

== Floodings during the project ==
The Green Brook Flood Control project has languished for decades due to a lack of federal funding. Hurricane Floyd in 1999 caused yet more property damage and deaths in the Green Brook basin, especially in Bound Brook, and reinvigorated the flood control project. As of 2006, two levees have been built on the western and eastern sides of Bound Brook. An important levee (R2) on the southwestern side of Bound Brook, which would prevent the Raritan River from flooding the downtown and nearby residential areas, has been completed. Full 150 year protection of downtown and nearby residential areas of Bound Brook is effectively in place with final construction due to be completed by the summer of 2014.

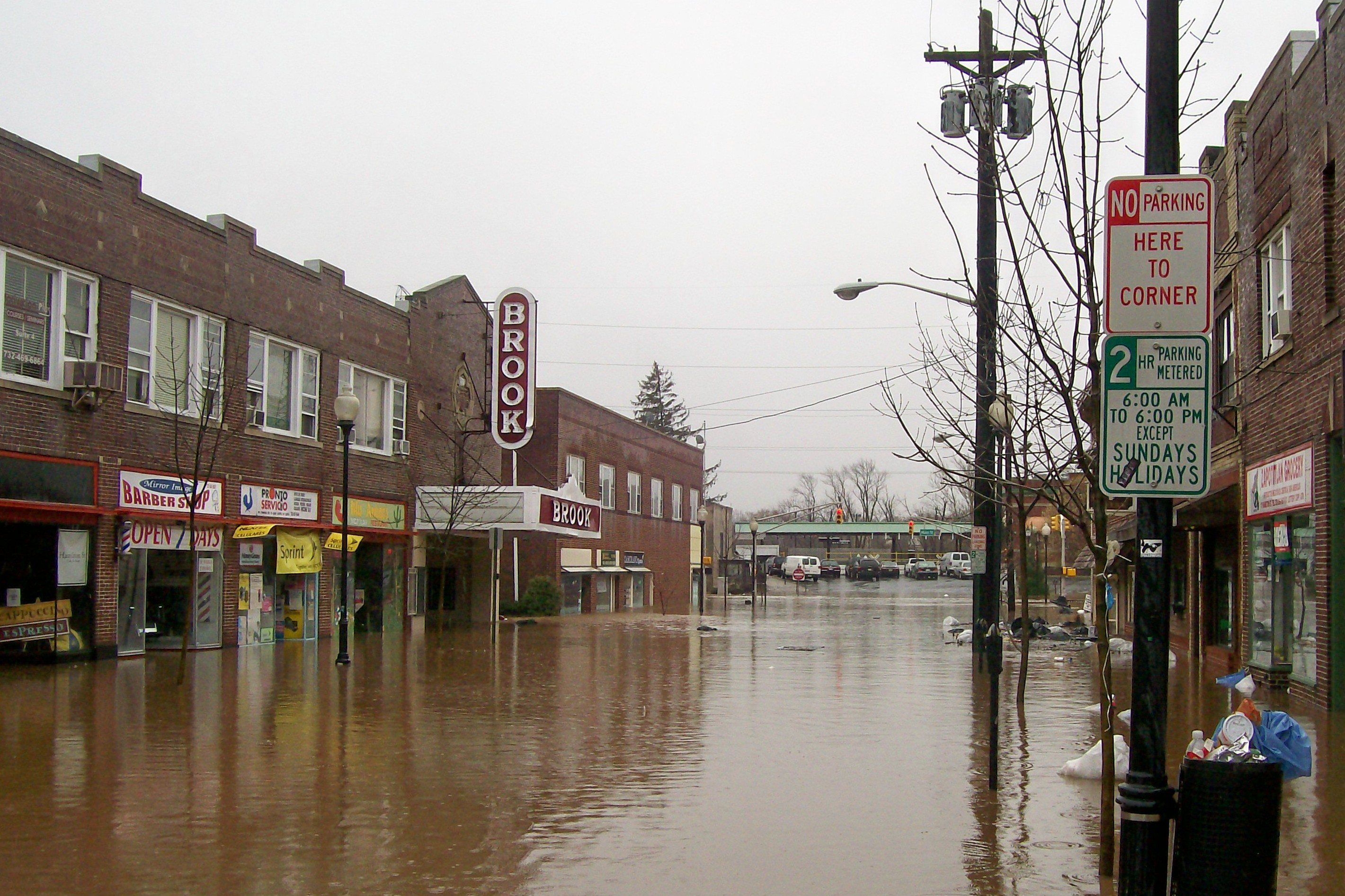
Downtown Bound Brook, New Jersey, April 16, 2007

The April Nor'easter of 2007 flooded Bound Brook with the second highest crest ever recorded in the area, as the envisioned flood protection systems were not yet fully in place. However, the April 2007 flooding did reinvigorate efforts to complete the flood levee protection system around Bound Brook, to protect it from future flooding.

Flooding of downtown occurred in August 2011 when Hurricane Irene passed along the East Coast.

== Current status ==
1. The R2 levee system is functionally complete – The R2 Levee System is designed to provide Bound Brook with protection from a 150-year flood level. The levee is built to the height of the raised Talmage Avenue Bridge.
2. Closure gates along Raritan are functionally complete – The gate closures across the New Jersey Transit railroad tracks on the western side of Bound Brook and at the South Main Street railroad underpass that leads to Queens Bridge have been completed and are used to keep flood waters out of Bound Brook.
3. The new Talmadge Avenue Bridge that connects Bound Brook and Bridgewater, New Jersey is functionally complete. The replacement bridge was built to the height of the R2 Levee to prevent Middle Brook and Raritan River waters from entering Bound Brook from the west.
4. To improve water flow through Bound Brook, the former Conrail bridge over the Raritan River and its associated railroad embankment that were located east of Bound Brook were removed during 2007. The bridge and embankment, when they were in place, acted to block the river flow through the Bound Brook area. To build the main Bound Brook R2 levee, the bridge and embankment needed to be removed.

=== Finderne Wetlands mitigation project ===
The Finderne Wetlands mitigation project (also known as Finderne Farms) is a wetlands project upstream of Bound Brook in Bridgewater, New Jersey that is tied into the Green Brook Flood Control project. When completed, Finderne Farms will serve as a Somerset County park with trails through wetlands and ballfields. More importantly, Finderne Farms will serve as an upstream wetland that will help to reduce flooding in the Raritan River valley by providing space for floodwaters to pool.

=== Sebrings Bridge ===
A roadway bridge called the Sebrings Bridge, which crosses the Green Brook and links Sebrings Mills Road and Greenbrook Road in the respective towns of Green Brook and Middlesex, was replaced in 2012 as part of the Green Brook Flood Control project. The bridge currently slows water flow in the Green Brook during periods of high water runoff and causes flooding in the areas upstream of the bridge. The new bridge will be widened and raised to ease water flow. Federal funding is in place for Fiscal Year 2014 for the bridge replacement. Replacement of the bridge also will allow for additional future flood mitigation measures in the areas adjacent to the bridge, such as additional flood walls and levees.
