= Oscar Teale =

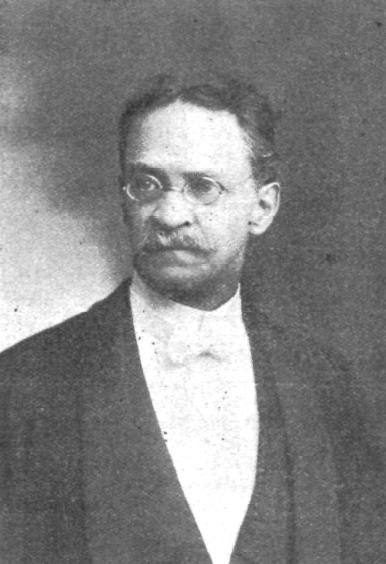
- Born: September 9, 1847
- Died: April 8, 1934 (aged 86)
- Occupations: Architect, magician

Oscar Schutte Teale (September 9, 1847 - April 8, 1934) was an American architect, magician and writer.

== Biography ==
Teale was born in New York City. He worked as an architect by trade and was interested in magic. He was the fourth President of the Society of American Magicians. He worked as a private secretary for magician Harry Houdini. He wrote a series of articles on magic and debunking spiritualism in the Sphinx magazine in 1925.

In July 1925 it was alleged that Houdini and Teale visited the offices of Houdina Radio Control and damaged most of the furniture by smashing them against the floor and walls. Houdini had accused the company of using his name unlawfully. A summons for disorderly conduct was issued against Houdini but the charges were dropped because George Young the manager failed to appear in court.

Teale worked as an editor, illustrator and ghost writer for Houdini. He stated that Houdini contributed fragments to his books but the majority of the writing was done by hirelings. When Houdini's book A Magician Among the Spirits (1924) was published, Teale stated that he had written "the damnable work".

Teale designed the exedra monument for Houdini's family. In October, 1916 it was installed at Machpelah Cemetery. He was elected into the Society of American Magicians Hall of Fame.

== Architectural designs ==
- Reformed Church on Staten Island (54 Port Richmond Ave., Staten Island, NY) (1898)
- All Souls Church, Plainfield, New Jersey (1892)
- Presbyterian Church, Bound Brook, New Jersey (1896)
- 53-55 Beach Street, Tribeca West Historic District, New York (1885)
- Old Main, Centenary University, Hackettstown, New Jersey (1901)

== Publications ==
Articles

- Teale, Oscar (1925). The Mystery of Spiritualism - Magic Versus Spiritualism (First Installment). Sphinx 24 (2): 46.
- Teale, Oscar (1925). The Mystery of Spiritualism - Magic Versus Spiritualism (Second Installment). Sphinx 24 (3): 84–85.
- Teale, Oscar (1925). The Mystery of Spiritualism - Magic Versus Spiritualism (Third Installment). Sphinx 24 (4): 134.
- Teale, Oscar (1925). The Mystery of Spiritualism - Magic Versus Spiritualism (Fourth Installment). Sphinx 24 (5): 156.
- Teale, Oscar (1925). The Mystery of Spiritualism - Magic Versus Spiritualism (Fifth Installment). Sphinx 24 (6): 183–185.
- Teale, Oscar (1925). The Mystery of Spiritualism - Magic Versus Spiritualism (Sixth Installment). Sphinx 24 (7): 207.

Books

- Higher Magic: Magic for the Artist (New York: Adams Press Print, 1920)
- Open Sesame (New York: Adams Press Print, 1920)
- Elliott's Last Legacy (New York: Adams Press Print, 1923) [Illustrations by Oscar Teale]
- A Magician Among the Spirits (1924) [with Harry Houdini]
