= 53–55 Beach Street =

Commercial building in Manhattan, New York

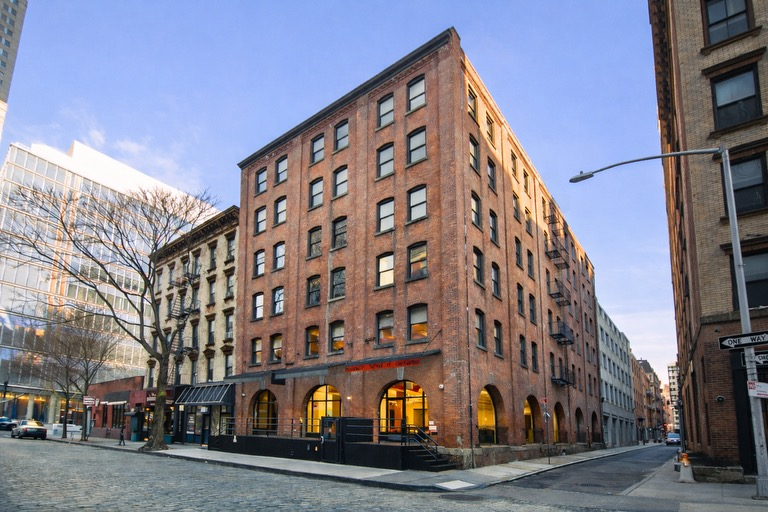
- 53–55 Beach Street in 2025
- Interactive map of the 53–55 Beach Street area

General information
- Type: Commercial
- Location: Manhattan, New York, United States
- Coordinates: 40°43′15.0024″N 74°0′33.9474″W
- Construction started: 1885

Technical details
- Floor count: 7

Design and construction
- Architect: Oscar Teale
- Developer: Joseph Naylor

53–55 Beach Street is a historic seven-story building, located at the northwest corner of Beach Street and Collister Street, in the TriBeCa West Historic District of Manhattan, New York City. Originally commissioned in 1885, the building was designed by architect Oscar S Teale and commissioned by prominent developer Joseph Naylor. At the time of construction, it replaced two early nineteenth-century structures and exemplified the utilitarian warehouse architecture typical of the late 19th century.

The building's facade features bold round arched openings at street level with granite keystones and a stone water table course. The upper five floors showcase bays of segmentally arched double-hung windows set between brick piers expressed as buttresses rather than decorative pilasters, reflecting the building's industrial function. The Beach Street side historically included loading bays, protected by iron bands and steel loading platforms, emphasizing its warehouse use.

== History ==
=== Pre-Development ===
In the early 1800s, 55 Beach Street was the residence of the principal of Rev. Dr. Barry's Academy, where "one or two young gentlemen can be taken by him into his family, at 55 Beach Street" to be further educated. As per the Evening Post, the School had the support of Rev. Bishop John Henry Hobart, and the Episcopal Clergy of the city generally, as well as the Rev. Dr. William Harris, President of Columbia University. Beginning in 1839, it became occupied by the Day School for Young Ladies, which moved from 11 Varick Street, to 55 Beach Street, at the time noted as the "fourth house from St. John's Park."

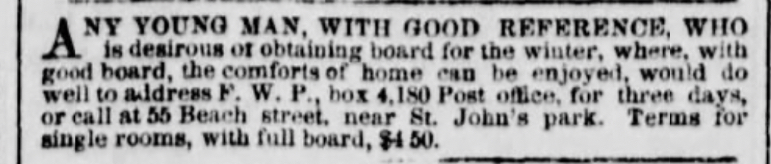
Advertisement in the December 10, 1858 edition of the New York Daily Herald, listing the space for rent.

In 1857, it was converted into a residential space, rented to "any young man, with good reference," for $450 a term, as per an advertisement in the New York Daily Herald.

Prior to its sale and later renovation, in 1864, 55 Beach Street was deemed a "valuable three story and attic brick House" by the New York Times.

=== Post-Development ===
In 1889, after the development of the building by Joseph Naylor, it was listed publicly for the first time as consisting of both 53 and 55 Beach Streets, as the headquarters of Genna & Co, which received notoriety upon the 1902 strike of 500 of its employees (joining 3,000 employees of the American Can Company) protesting a rule "requiring them to fill in slips of giving the details of the work they do daily."

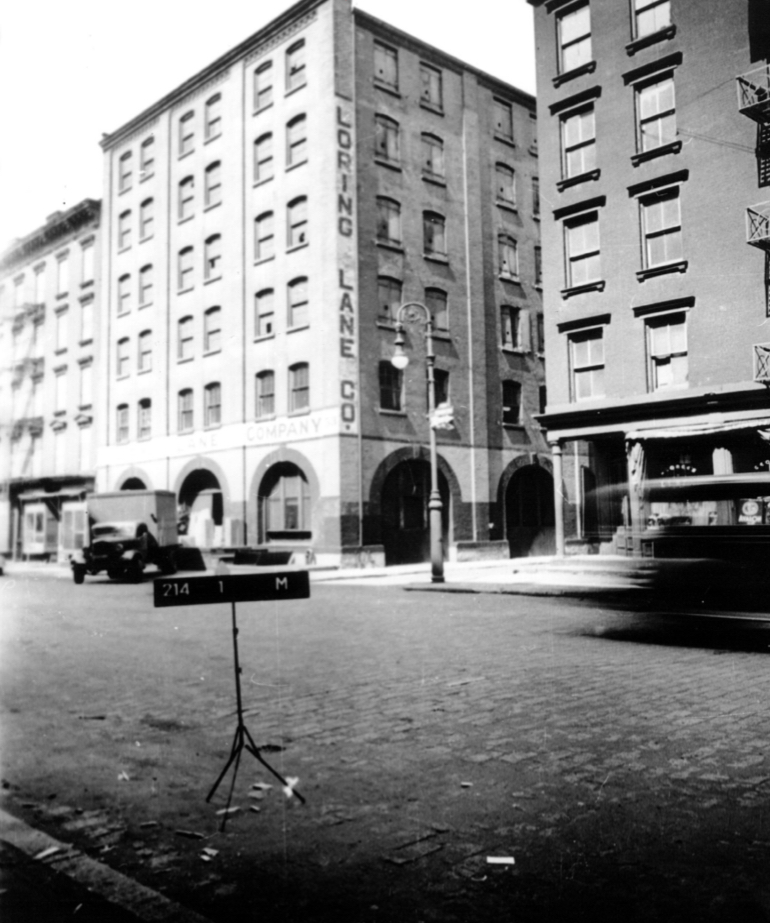
53–55 Beach Street circa 1930, under Loring Lane Company occupation.

53–55 Beach Street was one of twelve warehouses acquired in 1919 from the Mercantile Warehouse Company by the Independent Warehouses Inc, totaling over $3,000,000 ($57,000,000 in 2025 dollars).

From the mid-1920s through the 1940s, the Loring Lane Company used the building for wood and willow ware sales and storage. It was noted through the 1940s as being one of the distributors of Beacon Wax (a "marvel of science" that has a "sensational effect on floors").

=== 20th and 21st Century ===
From the 1960s to the 1980s, the building was occupied by the Appliance Packing and Warehousing Corporation. In recent decades, it was converted from warehouse use to office space and was home to the Montessori School of Manhattan until 2017, and WeWork until 2024.

In 2026, 53–55 Beach Street was the location of the opening scene of Love Story, the critically acclaimed television series produced by Ryan Murphy around the whirlwind courtship and marriage of John F. Kennedy Jr. and Carolyn Bessette-Kennedy.
