= James Augustine McFaul =

Irish clergyman

His Excellency, The Right Reverend James Augustine McFaul
- Bishop of Trenton
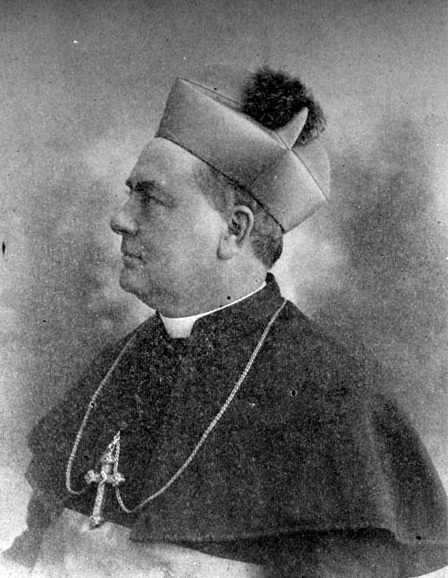
- See: Diocese of Trenton
- Appointed: July 20, 1894
- Predecessor: Michael J. O'Farrell
- Successor: Thomas Walsh

Orders
- Ordination: May 26, 1877 by Michael Corrigan
- Consecration: October 18, 1894 by Michael Corrigan

Personal details
- Born: June 6, 1850 Larne, County Antrim, Ireland, United Kingdom of Great Britain and Ireland
- Died: June 16, 1917 (aged 67) Trenton, New Jersey, US
- Parents: James McFaul & Mary Hefferman
- Education: St. Francis Xavier College; Saint Vincent College; Seton Hall College
- Motto: Gratia Dei sum id quod sum (By the grace of God, I am what I am)

James Augustine McFaul (June 6, 1850 – June 16, 1917) was an Irish-born prelate of the Roman Catholic Church. He served as bishop of the Diocese of Trenton in New Jersey from 1894 until his death in 1917.

== Biography ==
=== Early life ===
James McFaul was born on June 6, 1850, in Larne, County Antrim in Ireland, to James and Mary (née Hefferman) McFaul. The family moved to the United States when he was an infant, residing in New York City for four years before settling in Bound Brook, New Jersey. James McFaul worked on his father's farm and at age 15 became a clerk at a country store near Bound Brook.

With the intention of becoming a lawyer, McFaul attended Saint Vincent College in Latrobe, Pennsylvania, from 1867 to 1871. Deciding to become a priest, he entered St. Francis Xavier College in New York City in 1873 to study the classics. He then studied theology at Seton Hall College in South Orange, New Jersey.

=== Priesthood ===
McFaul was ordained to the priesthood for the Diocese of Newark at Seton Hall by Archbishop Michael Corrigan on May 26, 1877. After his ordination, McFaul was assigned as a curate at St. Patrick's Cathedral Parish in Newark. In 1879, he was transferred to what was then St. Mary's Church in Trenton, New Jersey.

In 1881, the Vatican erected the Diocese of Trenton out of the Diocese of Newark. The first bishop of Trenton, Michael J. O'Farrell, appointed McFaul in 1882 as his secretary. In 1884, McFaul was named pastor of the St. Mary, Star of the Sea Parish in Long Branch, New Jersey.

In October 1890, McFaul returned to what was now St. Mary's Cathedral in Trenton as its rector. He was appointed vicar general by O'Farrell in 1892. Upon O'Farrell's death in April 1894, McFaul was named the apostolic administrator of the diocese by the Vatican.

=== Bishop of Trenton ===
On July 20, 1894, McFaul was appointed the second bishop of Trenton by Pope Leo XIII. He received his episcopal consecration at St. Mary's Cathedral on October 18, 1894, from Archbishop Corrigan, with Bishops Charles McDonnell and Bernard McQuaid serving as co-consecrators.

During his tenure, McFaul helped erect many churches, schools, and institutions in New Jersey, including an orphanage at Hopewell, a home for senior citizens at Lawrenceville, and Mount St. Mary's College at Plainfield. He was also one of the key organizers of the American Federation of Catholic Societies. In 1909, McFaul created a controversy when he accused the professors at American colleges and universities of an "upbuilding of a cynicism and intimacy with immoral ideas."

James McFaul died at his residence in Trenton on June 16, 1917, aged 67.

Catholic Church titles
Preceded by Michael J. O'Farrell	Bishop of Trenton; 1894—1917	Succeeded by Thomas Walsh
