= Houdina Radio Control =

Former radio equipment firm

The Houdina Radio Control Company was an American a radio equipment firm of the 1920s, remembered for demonstrating a radio-operated automobile in several cities.

== History ==
The radio-operated automobile, American Wonder, 1925

Francis P. Houdina is credited with developing a radio-operated automobile. (Note: Newspaper reports that mention "Francis Houdina" are only found from June 1925 through July 1928. It is possible that the name was a pseudonym.) A 1926 Chandler was equipped with a transmitting antenna on the tonneau and operated from a second car that followed it with a transmitter. The radio signals operated small electric motors that directed every movement of the car. On July 27, 1925, a public demonstration of the radio-controlled driverless car American Wonder was conducted in New York City streets, traveling up Broadway and down Fifth Avenue through thick traffic. The car reportedly "barely missed trucks, automobiles and a milk wagon, finally crashing into a sedan."

Also in July 1925, illusionist Harry Houdini and his secretary, Oscar Teale, visited the New York City offices of Houdina Radio Control and an argument broke out. Houdini damaged the furniture and an electric chandelier, accusing the company of using his name unlawfully. (Note: Erik Weisz adopted his "Harry Houdini" professional name from French magician Jean-Eugène Robert-Houdin.) Afterwards, Francis P. Houdina said that there had never been any intention on his part to capitalize on the name of Houdini. A summons for disorderly conduct was issued against Houdini, but the charges were dropped because George Young, the Houdina Radio Control manager, failed to appear in court.

A second New York City test drive, this time with an escort of motorcycle police, was conducted on August 1, 1925. In October 1925, the Houdina radio-operated automobile was demonstrated in Boston. In January 1927, after Houdina reportedly left Indianapolis without paying some of his workers, a story was circulated that the "radio control" was actually being done by a person hidden in the car. In February 1927, two youths from Kaukauna, Wisconsin, reportedly took some of the company's equipment after not being paid; the equipment was returned to local police, and police in Chicago were investigating Arthur L. Grayson, "who had gone under other names during his business career", of the Houdina company.

Reports of demonstrations of a "phantom motor car" or "phantom auto" in December 1926 in Milwaukee, Wisconsin, and in June 1932 in Fredericksburg, Virginia, do not mention Houdina (the person or the company), although described capabilities of the car were consistent with the Houdina vehicle.

== See also ==
- Autonomous car
- Unmanned ground vehicle
- Radio control
