= Bound Brook (Raritan River tributary) =

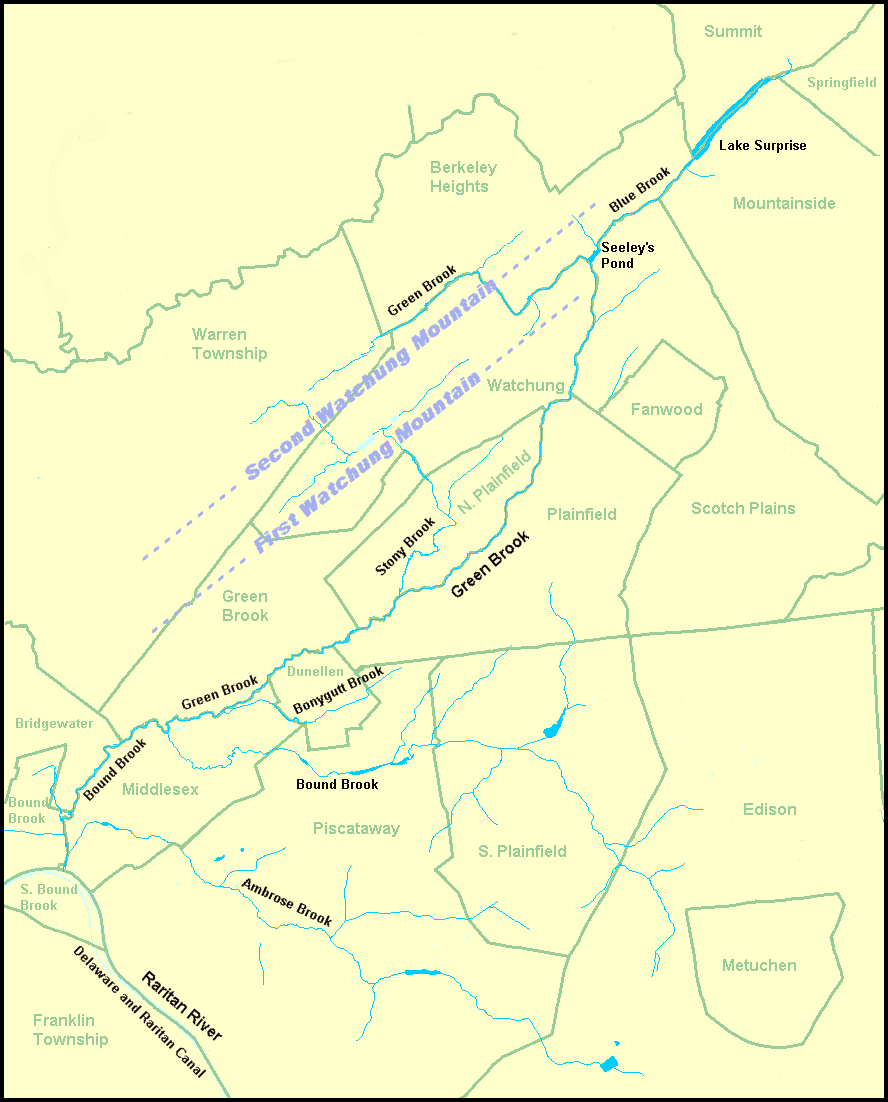
- Bound Brook, Green Brook and tributaries
- Native name: Sacunk

Location
- Country: United States
- State: New Jersey
- County: Middlesex County

Physical characteristics
- Source: Edison, New Jersey
  - location: Edison, New Jersey, Edison, New Jersey
  - coordinates: 40°32′23″N 74°23′23″W
- Mouth: Green Brook
  - location: Middlesex, New Jersey
  - coordinates: 40°33′34″N 74°31′33″W
  - elevation: 20 ft (6.1 m)

Bound Brook is a tributary of the Raritan River in Middlesex County, New Jersey, in the United States.

Its name comes from a boundary in an Indian deed. The stream is referred to as Sacunk, a Native American name meaning "slow sluggish stream", on early maps of the area.

It rises in Edison (near Interstate 287 and County Route 501) and flows through the Dismal Swamp. It then flows through South Plainfield and the Cedar Brook joins it southwest of Spring Lake. It continues through Piscataway into New Market Pond, through Middlesex where it flows into the Green Brook at the northwest corner of Mountain View Park.

It gives its name to the borough of Bound Brook, New Jersey.

== Tributaries ==
- Ambrose Brook
- Green Brook
  - Bonygutt Brook
  - Stony Brook
  - Blue Brook

== See also ==
- List of rivers of New Jersey
