= Green Brook Park =

- U.S. National Register of Historic Places
- U.S. Historic district
- New Jersey Register of Historic Places
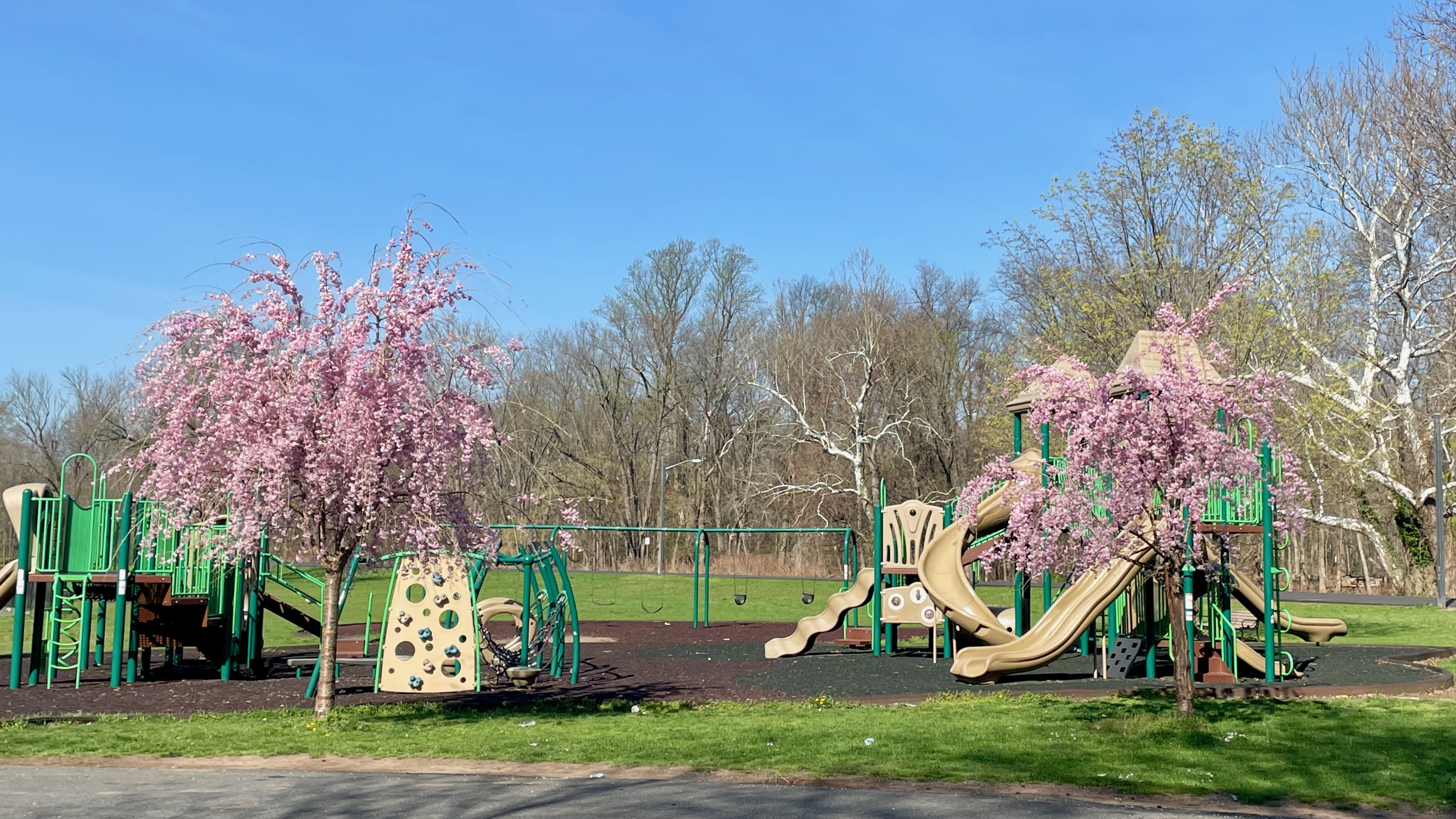
- Playground and flowering trees

- Location within Union County, New Jersey Location within Somerset County, New Jersey Location within New Jersey Location within the United States
- Location: All parkland from Clinton Ave. to W of West End Ave., and Jct of Lawrence and Parkview Ave., Fisk and Townsend Pls. Plainfield, New Jersey
- Coordinates: 40°36′30″N 74°26′43″W
- Area: 100 acres (40 ha)
- Architect: Olmsted Brothers
- Architectural style: Late 19th And Early 20th Century American Movements, City Beautiful Movement
- NRHP reference No.: 04000437
- NJRHP No.: 3551

Significant dates
- Added to NRHP: May 14, 2004
- Designated NJRHP: March 8, 2004

Green Brook Park is a 100-acre (40 ha) county park along the Green Brook, a tributary of the Raritan River, in the city of Plainfield in Union County, New Jersey. Designed by the Olmsted Brothers, it was added to the National Register of Historic Places on May 14, 2004, for its significance in landscape architecture. It extends into the borough of North Plainfield in Somerset County.

== History and description ==
The Union County Park Commission was established in 1921 and hired the Olmsted Brothers, formed by the sons of landscape architect Frederick Law Olmsted, to design a county park system, including this one along the Green Brook. The initial park development from Clinton Avenue to West End Avenue started in 1922. Along Park Drive, the area is pastoral, with a forested area north of the Green Brook. The park was expanded east of West End Avenue during the 1930s.

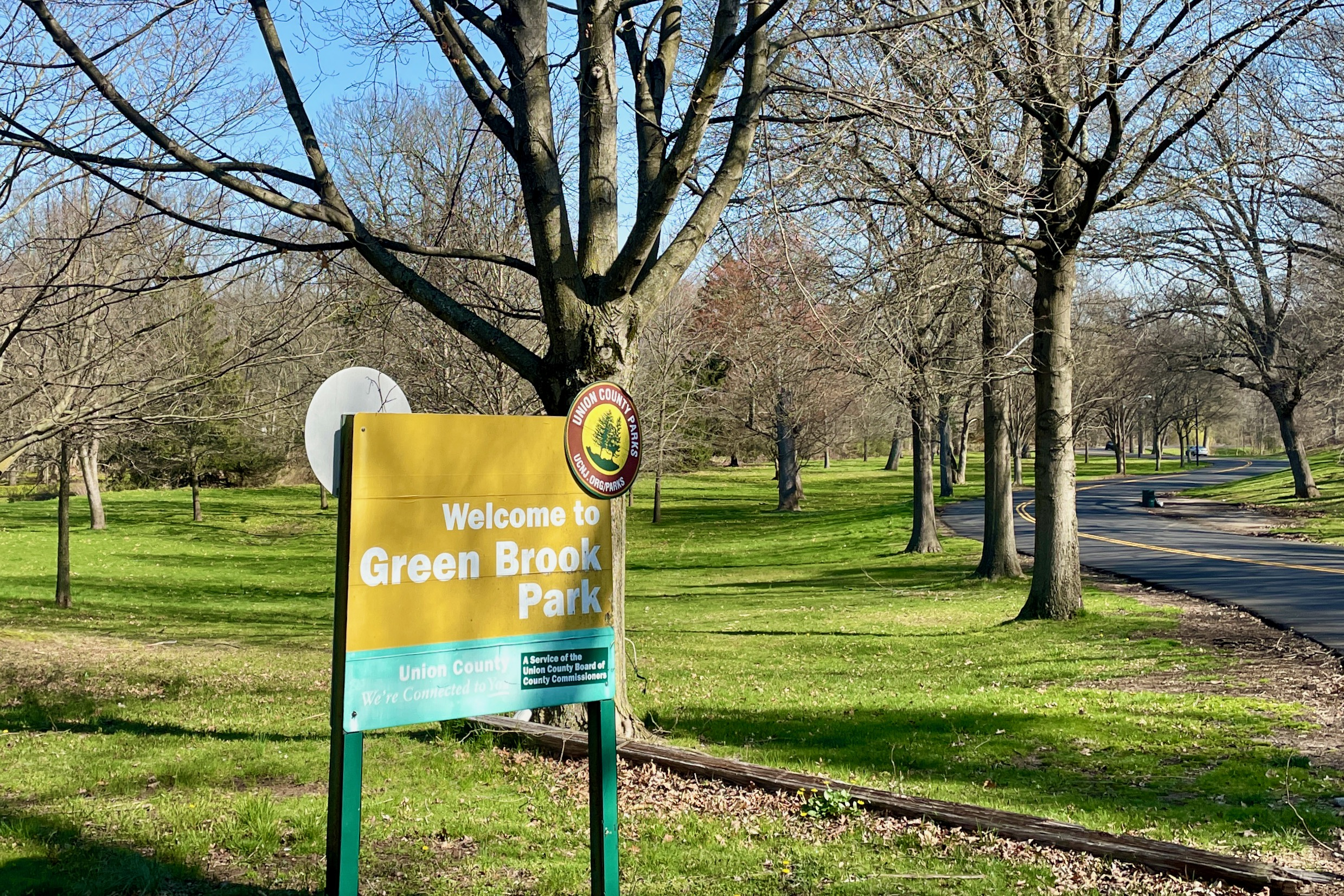
Clinton Avenue entrance

== See also ==
- National Register of Historic Places listings in Union County, New Jersey
