= Presbyterian Church at Bound Brook =

Historic church in New Jersey, United States

- U.S. National Register of Historic Places
- New Jersey Register of Historic Places
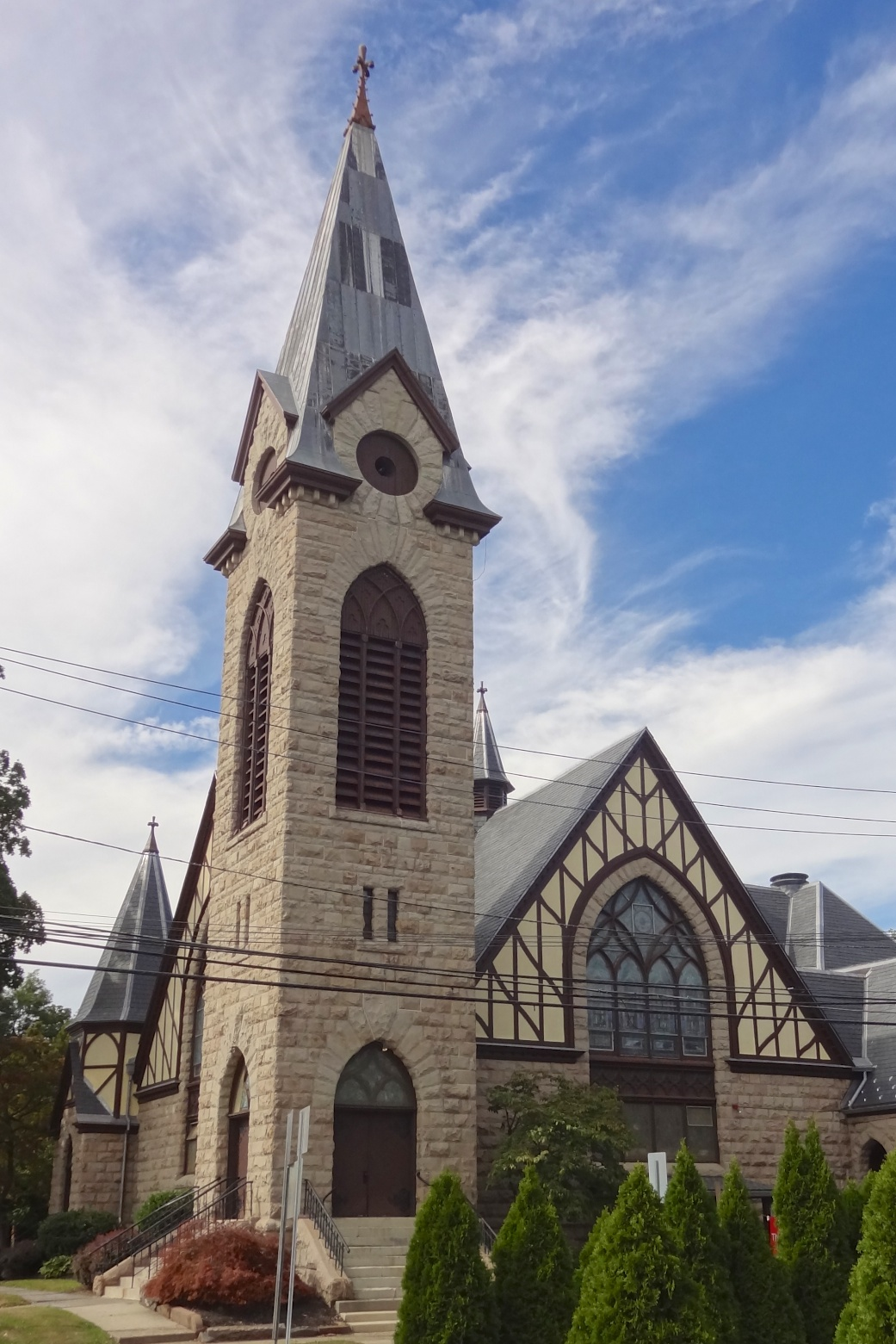

- Location within Somerset County, New Jersey Location within New Jersey Location within the United States
- Location: 409 Mountain Avenue, Bound Brook, New Jersey
- Coordinates: 40°34′1″N 74°31′52″W
- Area: 0.8 acres (0.32 ha)
- Built: 1896
- Architect: Oscar Schutte Teale
- Architectural style: Late 19th century Eclecticism
- NRHP reference No.: 07000876
- NJRHP No.: 4429

Significant dates
- Added to NRHP: August 28, 2007
- Designated NJRHP: July 5, 2007

Presbyterian Church at Bound Brook is a historic church at 409 Mountain Avenue in Bound Brook, Somerset County, New Jersey. The congregation was founded in the 18th century and is one of the oldest in New Jersey. The building was added to the National Register of Historic Places on August 28, 2007 for its significance in ecclesiastical architecture from 1896 to 1922.

== History ==
The Reverend Israel Read was the first pastor to be called to minister to the congregation, serving between 1750 and his death in 1793. Several temporary or "supply pastors" served the congregation before Read. The earliest recorded grave in the Old Presbyterian Graveyard was dated 1744. Currently the oldest extent legible stone is dated 1760 marking the grave of Catherine Read, the infant daughter of Israel and Mary Read.

The current building was constructed in 1896 to the design of architect Oscar Teale who was also a magician who worked closely with Harry Houdini. The building has elements of both Tudor Revival and Gothic Revival architecture. Several Tiffany-designed stained glass windows grace the church.

== Gallery ==
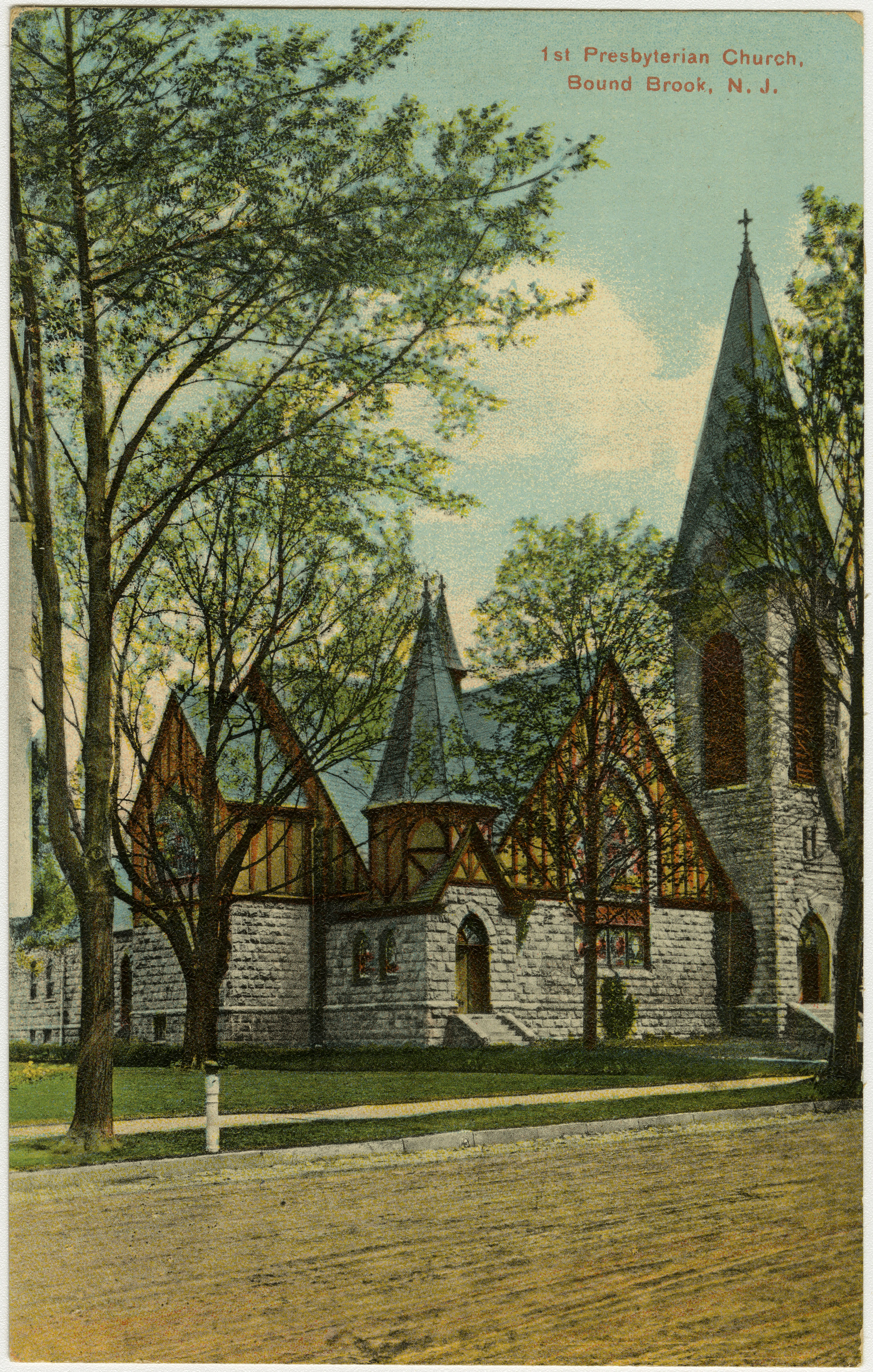
An early postcard

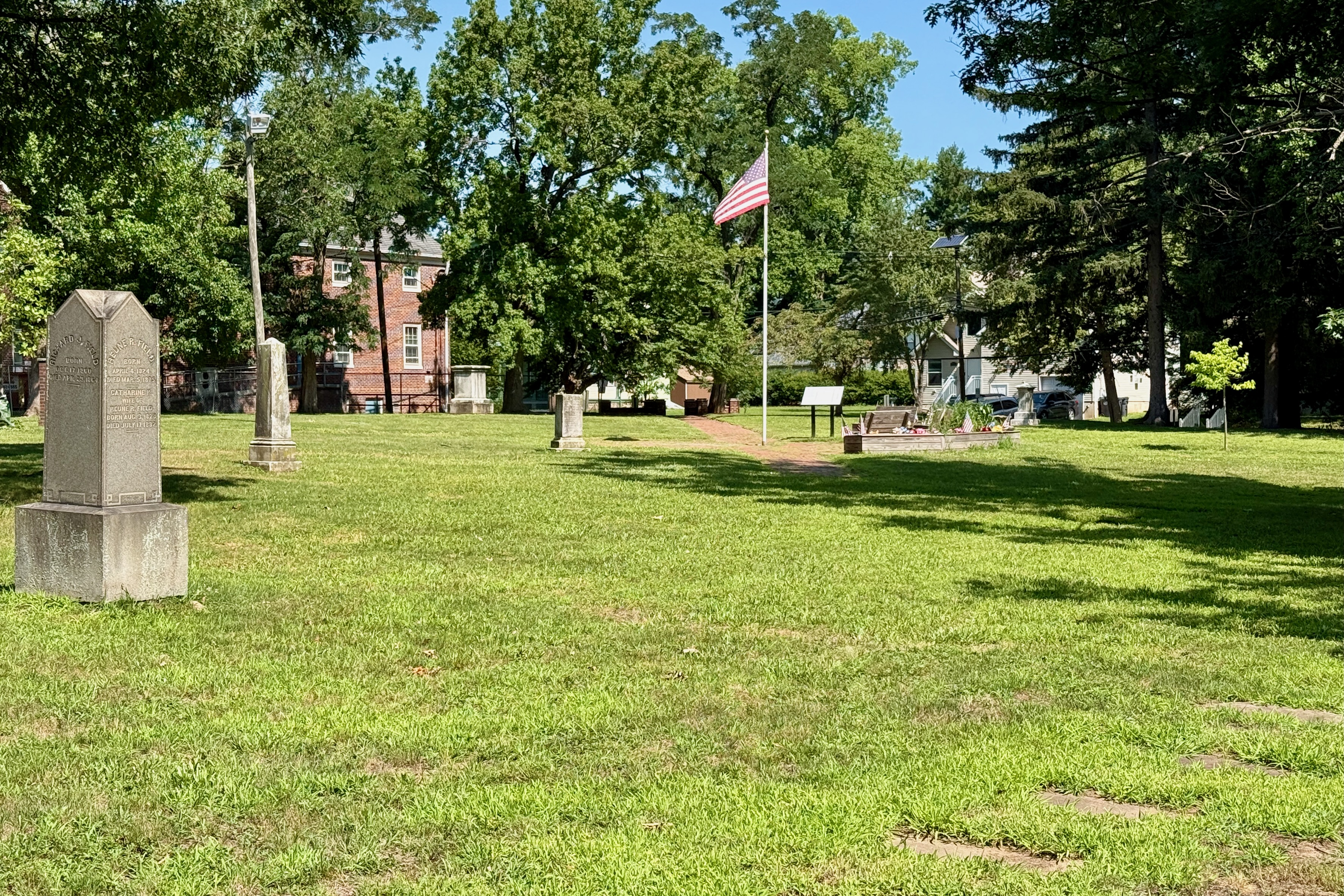
The Old Presbyterian Graveyard

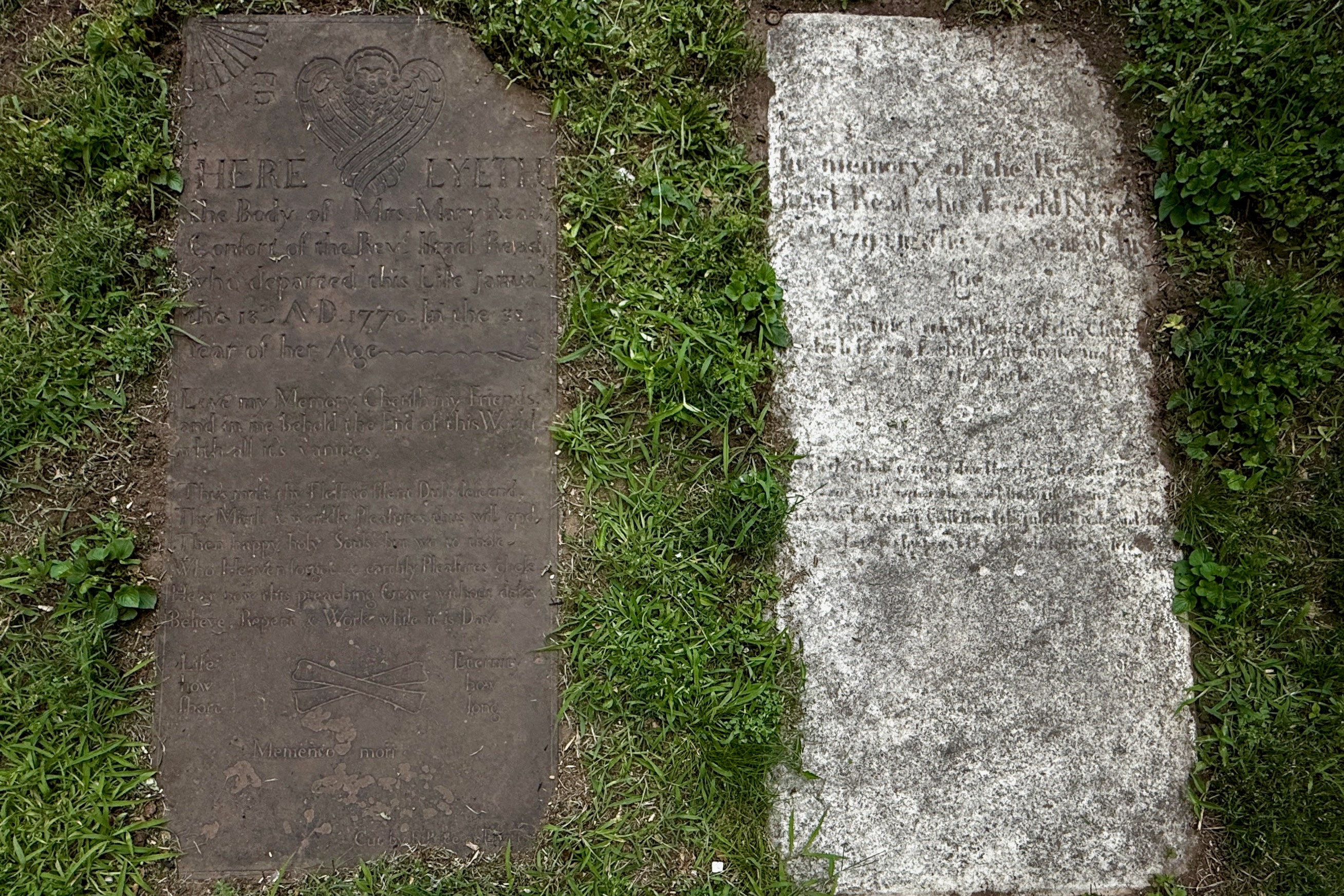
Gravestones of Israel and Mary Read
