= American Federation of Catholic Societies =

The American Federation of Catholic Societies was formed in 1901 to encourage Catholic unity and promote Catholic interests. Bishop James McFaul of Trenton was one of the key organizers of the federation. The Federation focused on social and economic questions as well as issues of public morality and education. In 1910, it created a Committee on Social Reform chaired by Father Peter Dietz. The committee supported the organization of labor; however, it became a strong opponent of socialist influence in the unions.

Although it was approved by the Apostolic Delegate and the Catholic hierarchy of the United States as well as receiving the blessing of both Pope Leo XIII and Pope Pius X, the Federation never spoke for the bishops and, in fact, was criticized by many bishops who were concerned that a national Catholic organization would feed the suspicions of nativists who might portray such an organization as an example of "papist aggression" with the goals of "taking over" Protestant America. This stance was opposed by John J. Burke, a Paulist priest and editor of the Catholic World. Burke believed that it was crucial for Catholics to develop a national organization in order to defend themselves and spread their faith.

By 1917, the AFCS was reported to have approximately 2 million members.

During World War I, the AFCS was merged into the National Council of Catholic Men.
