= Bound Brook, New Jersey =

Borough in Somerset County, New Jersey, US

- Borough
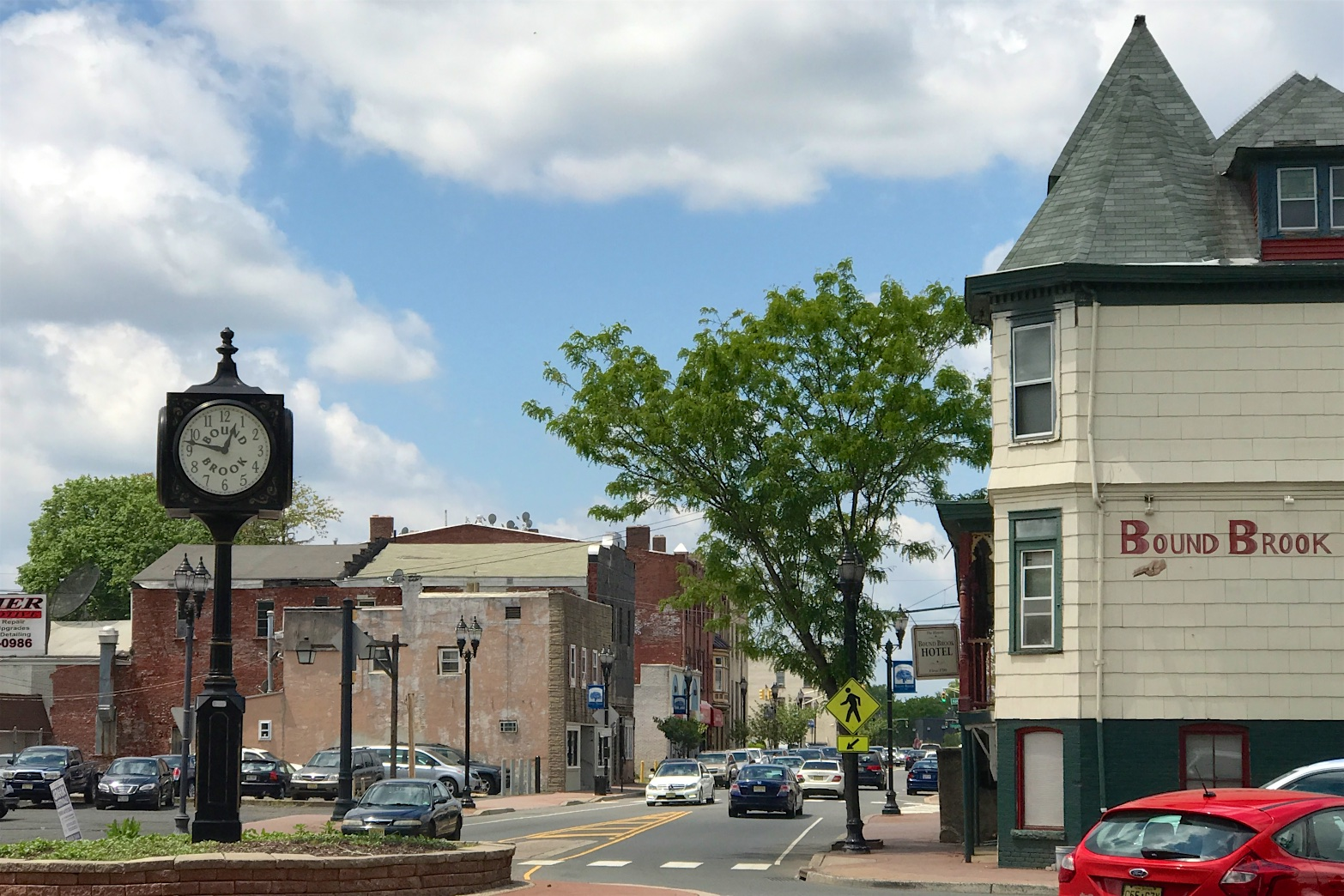
- Bound Brook Hotel on Main Street

- Seal

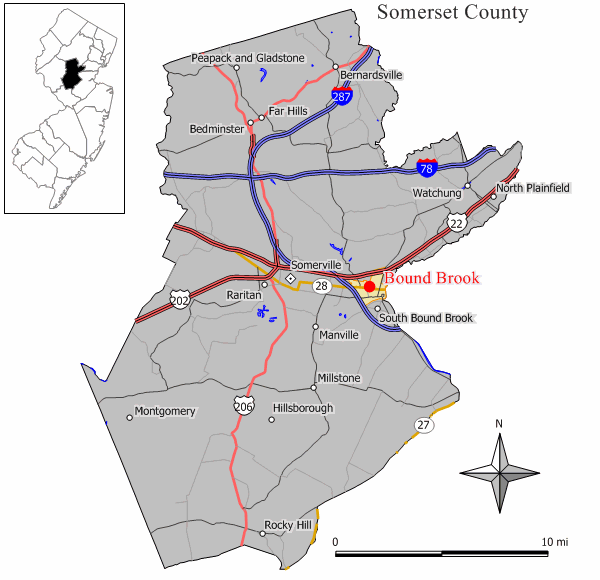
- Location of Bound Brook in Somerset County highlighted in yellow (right). Inset map: Location of Somerset County in New Jersey highlighted in black (left).

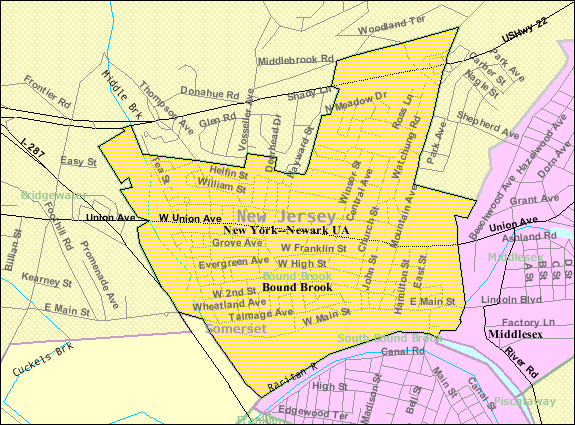
- Census Bureau map of Bound Brook, New Jersey

- Location in Somerset County Location in New Jersey Location in the United States
- Coordinates: 40°34′06″N 74°32′18″W
- Country: United States
- State: New Jersey
- County: Somerset
- Incorporated: February 11, 1891
- Named for: Bound Brook (Raritan River)

Government
  - Type: Borough
  - Body: Borough Council
  - Mayor: Dominic Longo (D, unexpired term ends December 31, 2027)
  - Administrator: Jasmine D. McCoy
  - Municipal clerk: Jasmine D. McCoy

Area
  - Total: 1.69 sq mi (4.39 km^{2})
  - Land: 1.66 sq mi (4.30 km^{2})
  - Water: 0.035 sq mi (0.09 km^{2}) 2.00%
  - Rank: 432nd of 565 in state 18th of 21 in county
- Elevation: 43 ft (13 m)

Population (2020)
  - Total: 11,988
  - Estimate (2023): 12,371
  - Rank: 212th of 565 in state 10th of 21 in county
  - Density: 7,217.3/sq mi (2,786.6/km^{2})
  - Rank: 64th of 565 in state 3rd of 21 in county
- Time zone: UTC−05:00 (Eastern (EST))
  - Summer (DST): UTC−04:00 (Eastern (EDT))
- ZIP Code: 08805
- Area code: 732
- FIPS code: 3403506790
- GNIS feature ID: 885166
- Website: www.boundbrook-nj.org

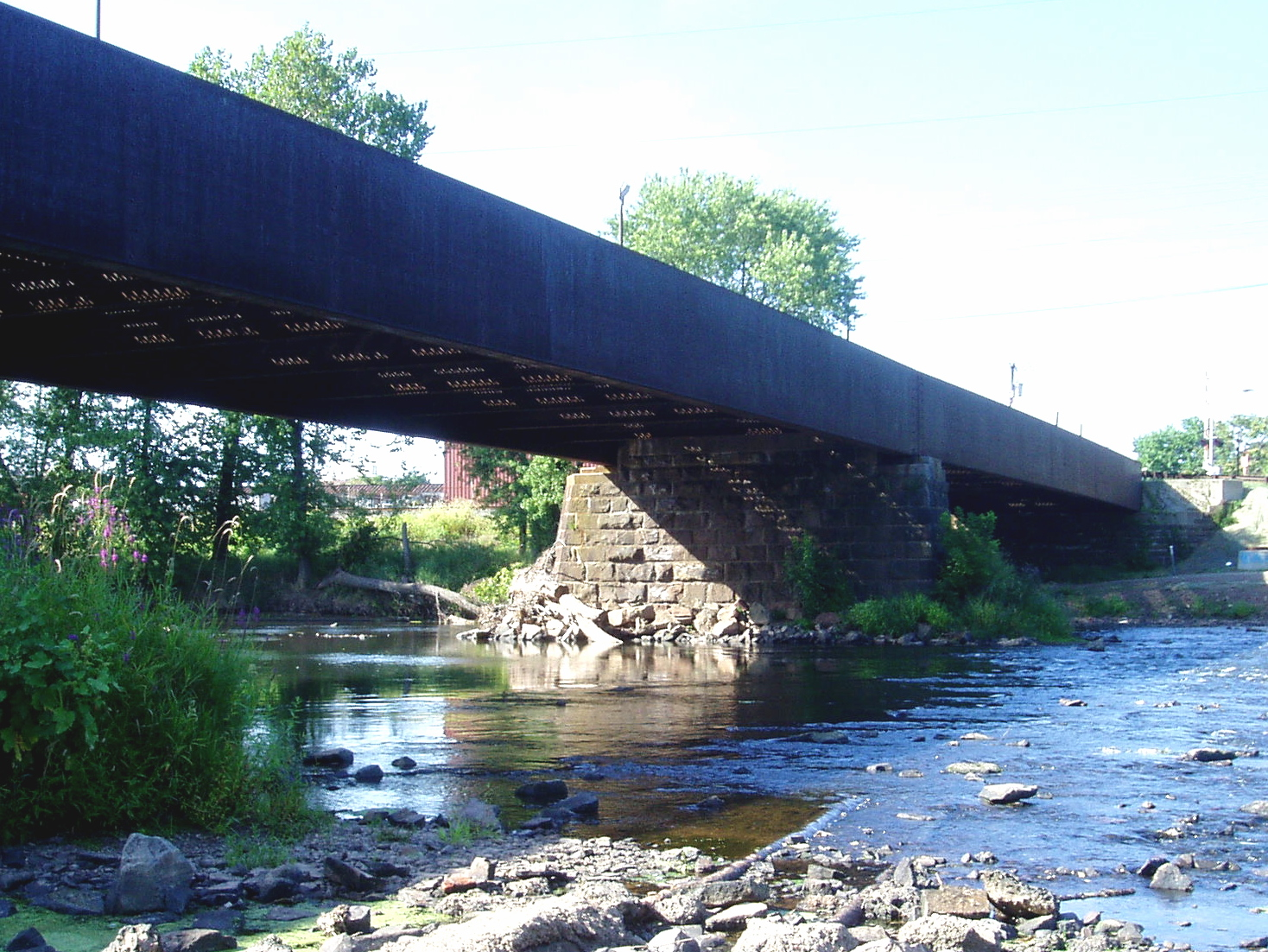
Queen's Bridge over the Raritan River

Bound Brook is a borough in Somerset County, in the U.S. state of New Jersey, located along the Raritan River. As of the 2020 United States census, the borough's population was 11,988, an increase of 1,586 (+15.2%) from the 2010 census count of 10,402, which in turn reflected an increase of 247 (+2.4%) from the 10,155 counted in the 2000 census.

Bound Brook was originally incorporated as a town by an act of the New Jersey Legislature on March 24, 1869, within portions of Bridgewater Township. On February 11, 1891, it was reincorporated as a borough, based on the results of a referendum held on the previous day.

== History ==
The area was first settled in 1681 and a community was established near the Bound Brook stream of the same name, which flows into the Raritan River via the Green Brook on the eastern side of the borough. The brook, which was mentioned as a boundary in a Native American deed, provides the source of the borough's name.

A wooden bridge over the Raritan River was erected as early as 1761 and named Queen's Bridge in 1767. Later, it became a covered bridge. During the American Revolutionary War, the bridge was used repeatedly by both sides including during the Battle of Bound Brook in 1777. In 1875, the wooden bridge was replaced by a steel pipe truss bridge. More than 100 years later, that bridge was itself replaced by a steel girder bridge in 1984, still using the old pillars. The bridge was renovated and repaved in 2007.

The Battle of Bound Brook, one of the battles in the New York and New Jersey campaign during the American Revolutionary War, occurred on April 13, 1777, and resulted in a defeat for the Continental Army, who were routed by about 4,000 troops under British command.

On April 22, 1921, over 100 people were injured in Bound Brook, and one died, when a cloud of phosgene gas began spreading over the city in the early morning hours, the result of a faulty valve of a storage tank at a paint factory in town. The intervention of four people stopped further escape of the phosgene, which had been used in concentrated form as a chemical weapon during World War I.

== Geography ==
According to the United States Census Bureau, the borough had a total area of 1.70 square miles (4.39 km^{2}), including 1.66 square miles (4.30 km^{2}) of land and 0.03 square miles (0.09 km^{2}) of water (2.00%).

The borough borders the municipalities of Bridgewater Township and South Bound Brook in Somerset County, and Middlesex Borough in Middlesex County.

Since the southern portion of the borough (including the downtown area) is a low-lying natural flood plain of the Raritan River, Bound Brook has suffered occasional severe flooding after heavy rain. Extensive flood control measures were put into place during 1999–2015 to provide protection from 150-year floods.

== Demographics ==
Historical population
Census	Pop.	Note	%±
1870	556		—
1880	934		68.0%
1890	1,462		56.5%
1900	2,622		79.3%
1910	3,970		51.4%
1920	5,906		48.8%
1930	7,372		24.8%
1940	7,616		3.3%
1950	8,374		10.0%
1960	10,263		22.6%
1970	10,450		1.8%
1980	9,710		−7.1%
1990	9,487		−2.3%
2000	10,155		7.0%
2010	10,402		2.4%
2020	11,988		15.2%
2023 (est.)	12,371	▲	3.2%
Population sources: 1870–1920; 1870 1880–1890; 1890–1910 1910–1930; 1940–2000 2000; 2010 2020

=== 2020 census ===
As of the 2020 census, Bound Brook had a population of 11,988. The median age was 36.3 years. 22.5% of residents were under the age of 18 and 10.9% of residents were 65 years of age or older. For every 100 females there were 104.9 males, and for every 100 females age 18 and over there were 103.8 males age 18 and over.

100.0% of residents lived in urban areas, while 0.0% lived in rural areas.

There were 4,181 households in Bound Brook, of which 36.2% had children under the age of 18 living in them. Of all households, 43.0% were married-couple households, 21.9% were households with a male householder and no spouse or partner present, and 26.5% were households with a female householder and no spouse or partner present. About 22.8% of all households were made up of individuals and 6.8% had someone living alone who was 65 years of age or older.

There were 4,389 housing units, of which 4.7% were vacant. The homeowner vacancy rate was 1.4% and the rental vacancy rate was 3.8%.

Racial composition as of the 2020 census
Race	Number	Percent
White	4,299	35.9%
Black or African American	1,071	8.9%
American Indian and Alaska Native	176	1.5%
Asian	489	4.1%
Native Hawaiian and Other Pacific Islander	4	0.0%
Some other race	3,885	32.4%
Two or more races	2,064	17.2%
Hispanic or Latino (of any race)	6,374	53.2%

=== 2010 census ===
The 2010 United States census counted 10,402 people, 3,586 households, and 2,435 families in the borough. The population density was 6,269.6 per square mile (2,420.7/km^{2}). There were 3,816 housing units at an average density of 2,300.0 per square mile (888.0/km^{2}). The racial makeup was 69.73% (7,253) White, 5.74% (597) Black or African American, 0.54% (56) Native American, 2.57% (267) Asian, 0.05% (5) Pacific Islander, 17.48% (1,818) from other races, and 3.90% (406) from two or more races. Hispanic or Latino of any race were 48.66% (5,062) of the population.

Of the 3,586 households, 32.7% had children under the age of 18; 45.1% were married couples living together; 14.9% had a female householder with no husband present and 32.1% were non-families. Of all households, 22.8% were made up of individuals and 7.9% had someone living alone who was 65 years of age or older. The average household size was 2.89 and the average family size was 3.28.

22.6% of the population were under the age of 18, 9.0% from 18 to 24, 34.2% from 25 to 44, 24.0% from 45 to 64, and 10.1% who were 65 years of age or older. The median age was 35.1 years. For every 100 females, the population had 109.7 males. For every 100 females ages 18 and older there were 108.4 males.

The Census Bureau's 2006–2010 American Community Survey showed that (in 2010 inflation-adjusted dollars) median household income was $67,056 (with a margin of error of +/− $6,450) and the median family income was $68,315 (+/− $7,489). Males had a median income of $33,462 (+/− $4,681) versus $35,261 (+/− $7,245) for females. The per capita income for the borough was $25,015 (+/− $2,011). About 3.4% of families and 3.9% of the population were below the poverty line, including 6.0% of those under age 18 and 2.5% of those age 65 or over.

The borough had one of the highest Costa Rican percentages of any municipality in the United States and third-highest in New Jersey (population 500+), with 3.4% of residents in the 2010 Census reporting that they were of Costa Rican birth.

=== 2000 census ===
At the 2000 United States census there were 10,155 people, 3,615 households and 2,461 families residing in the borough. The population density was 5,953.7 inhabitants per square mile (2,298.7/km^{2}). There were 3,802 housing units at an average density of 2,229.0 per square mile (860.6/km^{2}). The racial makeup of the borough was 82.57% White, 2.52% African American, 0.31% Native American, 2.88% Asian, 0.07% Pacific Islander, 8.67% from other races, and 2.99% from two or more races. Hispanic or Latino of any race were 34.87% of the population.

There were 3,615 households, of which 31.0% had children under the age of 18 living with them, 49.1% were married couples living together, 11.9% had a female householder with no husband present, and 31.9% were non-families. 23.1% of all households were made up of individuals, and 9.2% had someone living alone who was 65 years of age or older. The average household size was 2.81 and the average family size was 3.21.

21.7% of the population were under the age of 18, 10.6% from 18 to 24, 36.2% from 25 to 44, 18.9% from 45 to 64, and 12.5% who were 65 years of age or older. The median age was 34 years. For every 100 females, there were 107.1 males. For every 100 females age 18 and over, there were 106.7 males.

The median household income was $46,858 and the median family income was $51,346. Males had a median income of $32,226 versus $28,192 for females. The per capita income for the borough was $22,395. About 6.9% of families and 10.9% of the population were below the poverty line, including 13.8% of those under age 18 and 5.2% of those age 65 or over.

The borough had the highest Costa Rican percentage of any municipality in the United States (population 500+), with 14.7% of residents in the 2000 Census reporting that they were of Costa Rican birth.

== Parks and recreation ==
The borough has developed a series of trails for bicyclists and pedestrians that runs along the Raritan River, with a mix of paved and dirt trails providing access to residents.

== Government ==
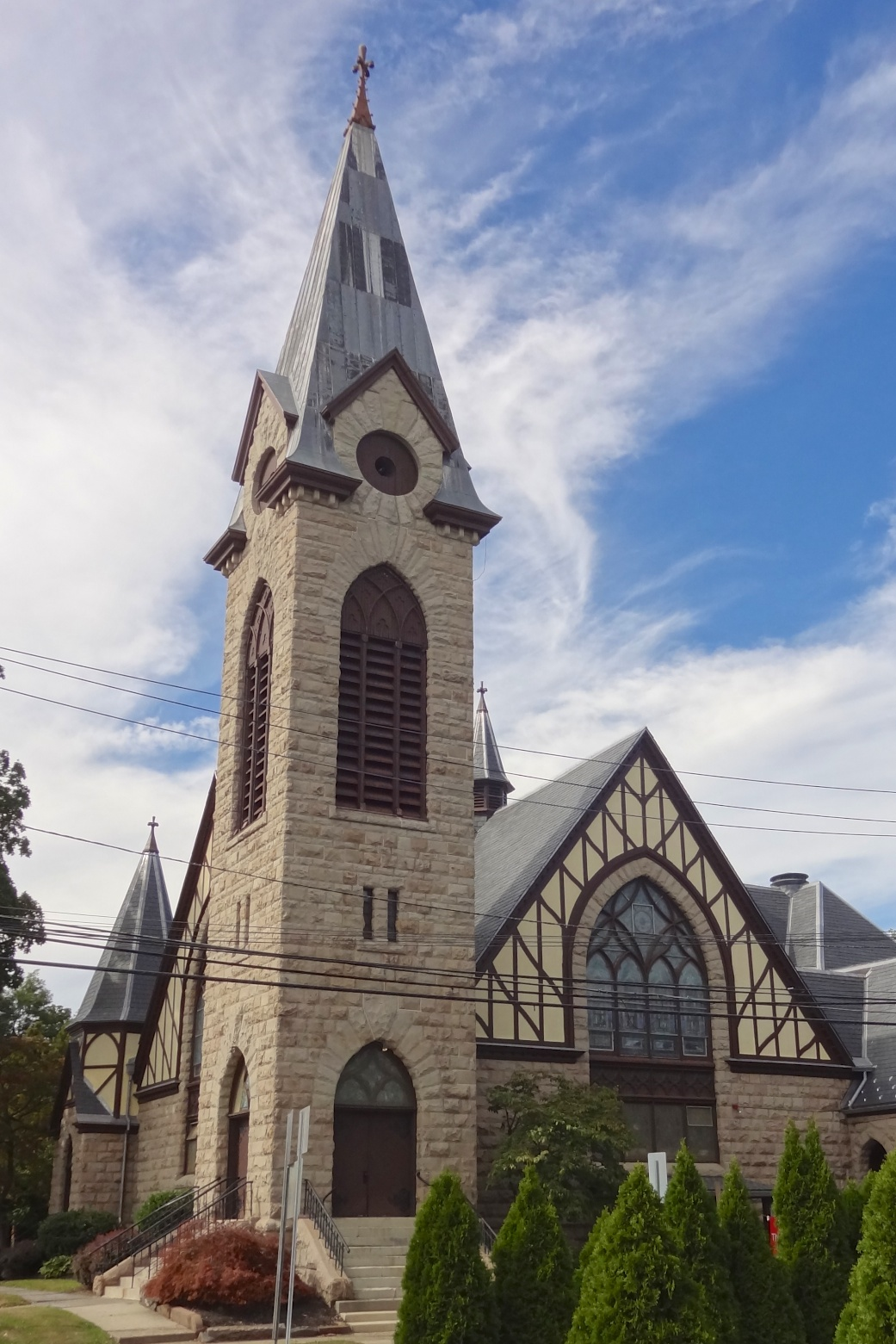
Presbyterian Church at Bound Brook

=== Local government ===
Bound Brook is governed under the borough form of New Jersey municipal government, which is used in 218 municipalities (of the 564) statewide, making it the most common form of government in New Jersey. The governing body is comprised of a mayor and a borough council, with all positions elected at-large on a partisan basis as part of the November general election. A mayor is elected directly by the voters to a four-year term of office. The borough council includes six members elected to serve three-year terms on a staggered basis, with two seats coming up for election each year in a three-year cycle.

The borough form of government used by Bound Brook is a "weak mayor / strong council" government, in which council members act as the legislative body, with the mayor presiding at meetings and voting only in the event of a tie. The mayor can veto ordinances, subject to an override by a two-thirds majority vote of the council. The mayor makes committee and liaison assignments for council members, and most appointments are made by the mayor with the advice and consent of the council.

As of 2024, the mayor of Bound Brook is Democrat Dominic Longo, whose term expires December 31, 2027. Members of the Borough Council are Council President Kendall Lopez (D, 2025), Linda Brnicevic (R, 2025), Shawn Guerra (D, 2026), David Morris (R, 2024; appointed to fill an unexpired term), Vinnie Petti (D, 2024) and Glen Rossi (R, 2026).

David Morris was appointed in January 2024 to fill the seat expiring in December 2024 that became vacant when Dominic Longo took office as mayor.

In September 2022, the borough council selected David Morris from a list of three candidates nominated by the Republican municipal committee to fill the mayoral seat expiring in December 2023 that became vacant after the resignation of Robert P. Fazen, who was moving out of the borough.

=== Federal, state and county representation ===
Bound Brook is located in the 12th Congressional District and is part of New Jersey's 23rd state legislative district.

For the 119th United States Congress, New Jersey's 12th congressional district is represented by Bonnie Watson Coleman (D, Ewing Township). New Jersey is represented in the United States Senate by Democrats Cory Booker (Newark, term ends 2027) and Andy Kim (Moorestown, term ends 2031).

For the 2026–2027 session, the 23rd legislative district of the New Jersey Legislature is represented in the State Senate by Doug Steinhardt (R, Lopatcong Township) and in the General Assembly by John DiMaio (R, Hackettstown) and Erik Peterson (R, Franklin Township).

Somerset County is governed by a five-member Board of County Commissioners, whose members are elected at-large to three-year terms of office on a staggered basis, with one or two seats coming up for election each year. At an annual reorganization meeting held in the first week of January, the board selects a Director and deputy director from among its members. As of 2025, Somerset County's County Commissioners are Director Shanel Robinson (D, Franklin Township, term as commissioner ends 2027; term as director ends 2026), Deputy Director Paul Drake (D, Hillsborough Township, term as commissioner and as deputy director ends 2026), Melonie Marano (D, Green Brook Township, 2028), Elizabeth Graner (D, Bernards Township, 2026; elected to serve an unexpired term) and Sara Sooy (D, Bedminster Township, 2027).

Constitutional officers, elected on a countywide basis are Clerk Steve Peter (D, Somerville, 2027), Sheriff Darrin Russo (D, Franklin Township, 2028) and Surrogate Bernice "Tina" Jalloh (D, Franklin Township, 2030).

=== Politics ===
As of March 2011, there were a total of 4,162 registered voters in Bound Brook, of which 1,149 (27.6% vs. 26.0% countywide) were registered as Democrats, 955 (22.9% vs. 25.7%) were registered as Republicans and 2,050 (49.3% vs. 48.2%) were registered as Unaffiliated. There were 8 voters registered as Libertarians or Greens. Among the borough's 2010 Census population, 40.0% (vs. 60.4% in Somerset County) of the total population were registered to vote, including 51.7% of those ages 18 and over (vs. 80.4% countywide).

United States presidential election results for Bound Brook
Year	Republican		Democratic		Third party(ies)	
Year	No.	%	No.	%	No.	%
2024	1,521	42.32%	1,983	55.18%	90	2.50%
2020	1,443	39.10%	2,177	58.98%	71	1.92%
2016	1,274	39.59%	1,812	56.31%	132	4.10%
2012	1,120	40.55%	1,598	57.86%	44	1.59%
2008	1,312	44.47%	1,593	54.00%	45	1.53%
2004	1,440	49.00%	1,474	50.15%	25	0.85%
2000	1,167	43.89%	1,391	52.31%	101	3.80%

In the 2012 presidential election, Democrat Barack Obama received 57.9% of the vote (1,598 cast), ahead of Republican Mitt Romney with 40.6% (1,120 votes), and other candidates with 1.6% (44 votes), among the 2,785 ballots cast by the borough's 4,399 registered voters (23 ballots were spoiled), for a turnout of 63.3%. In the 2008 presidential election, Democrat Barack Obama received 1,593 votes (53.5% vs. 52.1% countywide), ahead of Republican John McCain with 1,312 votes (44.0% vs. 46.1%) and other candidates with 45 votes (1.5% vs. 1.1%), among the 2,979 ballots cast by the borough's 3,990 registered voters, for a turnout of 74.7% (vs. 78.7% in Somerset County). In the 2004 presidential election, Democrat John Kerry received 1,474 votes (49.6% vs. 47.2% countywide), ahead of Republican George W. Bush with 1,440 votes (48.5% vs. 51.5%) and other candidates with 25 votes (0.8% vs. 0.9%), among the 2,970 ballots cast by the borough's 3,882 registered voters, for a turnout of 76.5% (vs. 81.7% in the whole county).

Gubernatorial election results for Bound Brook
Year	Republican		Democratic		Third party(ies)	
Year	No.	%	No.	%	No.	%
2025	967	34.87%	1,769	63.79%	37	1.33%
2021	998	49.11%	1,017	50.05%	17	0.84%
2017	885	48.26%	893	48.69%	56	3.05%
2013	1,092	64.54%	570	33.69%	30	1.77%
2009	1,074	52.98%	749	36.95%	204	10.06%
2005	945	46.41%	1,012	49.71%	79	3.88%

In the 2013 gubernatorial election, Republican Chris Christie received 64.5% of the vote (1,092 cast), ahead of Democrat Barbara Buono with 33.7% (570 votes), and other candidates with 1.8% (30 votes), among the 1,723 ballots cast by the borough's 4,485 registered voters (31 ballots were spoiled), for a turnout of 38.4%. In the 2009 gubernatorial election, Republican Chris Christie received 1,074 votes (52.2% vs. 55.8% countywide), ahead of Democrat Jon Corzine with 749 votes (36.4% vs. 34.1%), Independent Chris Daggett with 172 votes (8.4% vs. 8.7%) and other candidates with 32 votes (1.6% vs. 0.7%), among the 2,056 ballots cast by the borough's 4,138 registered voters, yielding a 49.7% turnout (vs. 52.5% in the county).

United States Senate election results for Bound Brook1
Year	Republican		Democratic		Third party(ies)	
Year	No.	%	No.	%	No.	%
2024	1,400	41.44%	1,877	55.57%	101	2.99%
2018	1,076	42.30%	1,370	53.85%	98	3.85%
2012	1,038	39.59%	1,525	58.16%	59	2.25%
2006	926	47.27%	949	48.44%	84	4.29%

United States Senate election results for Bound Brook2
Year	Republican		Democratic		Third party(ies)	
Year	No.	%	No.	%	No.	%
2020	1,408	38.48%	2,171	59.33%	80	2.19%
2014	847	52.00%	751	46.10%	31	1.90%
2013	512	52.46%	453	46.41%	11	1.13%
2008	1,204	43.91%	1,445	52.70%	93	3.39%

== Education ==
The Bound Brook School District serves students in pre-kindergarten through twelfth grade. As of the 2020–21 school year, the district, comprised of five schools, had an enrollment of 1,975 students and 172.0 classroom teachers (on an FTE basis), for a student–teacher ratio of 11.5:1. Schools in the district (with 2020–21 enrollment data from the National Center for Education Statistics) are LaMonte-Annex Elementary School with 195 students in grades PreK-Kindergarten Lafayette Elementary School with 266 students in grades 1-2, Smalley Elementary School with 545 students in grades 3-6, Community Middle School with 283 students in grades 7-8 and Bound Brook High School with 652 students in grades 9-12.

Students from South Bound Brook, New Jersey, attend the district's high school as part of a sending/receiving relationship with the South Bound Brook School District. At the start of the 2011–12 school year, the school joined the Interdistrict Public School Choice Program, which allows students from other area communities to attend the Bound Brook schools. In the 2011–2012 school year, the high school started a biomedical program from Project Lead the Way in addition to the existing engineering academy program.

There was an Interparochial Catholic School in the borough, Holy Family Academy (for Pre-K to grade 8) serving the local and surrounding communities with an estimated enrollment of 150 prior to closure. The school was one of three in the area closed by the Roman Catholic Diocese of Metuchen at the end of the 2010–2011 school year, with plans to feed remaining students to a school facility in South Plainfield.

In 2018, Stephen Kovacs founded and thereafter owned Kaprica United Fencing Academy in Bound Brook, where he was head coach.

Kovacs was accused in 2021 by detectives of allegedly sexually assaulting two teenage fencing students multiple times in 2020 and 2021; he died in Somerset County Jail in January 2022.

== Transportation ==
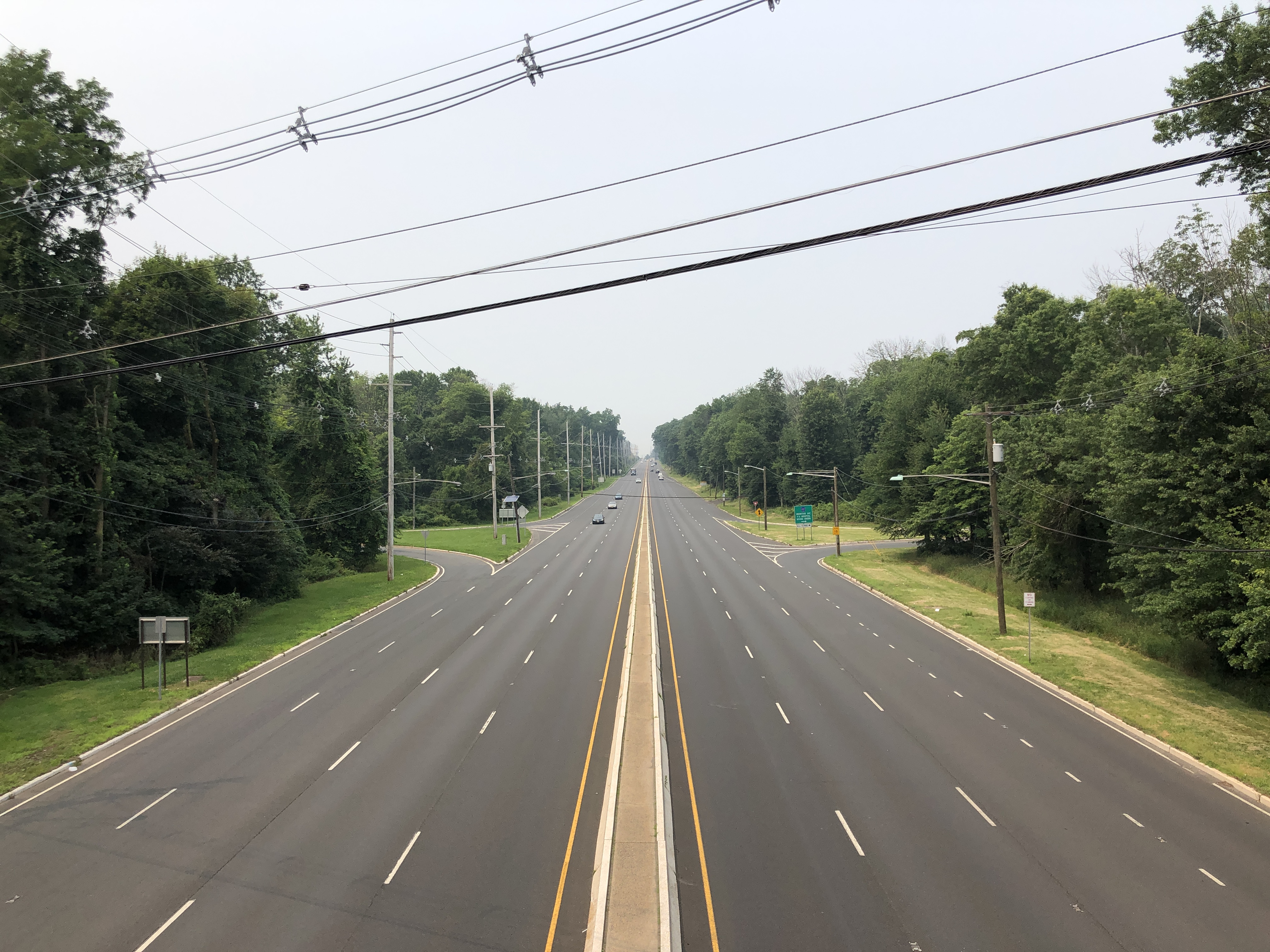
U.S. Route 22 in Bound Brook, the largest and busiest highway in the borough.

=== Roads and highways ===
As of May 2010, the borough had a total of 25.37 miles (40.83 km) of roadways, of which 20.56 miles (33.09 km) were maintained by the municipality, 2.73 miles (4.39 km) by Somerset County and 2.08 miles (3.35 km) by the New Jersey Department of Transportation.

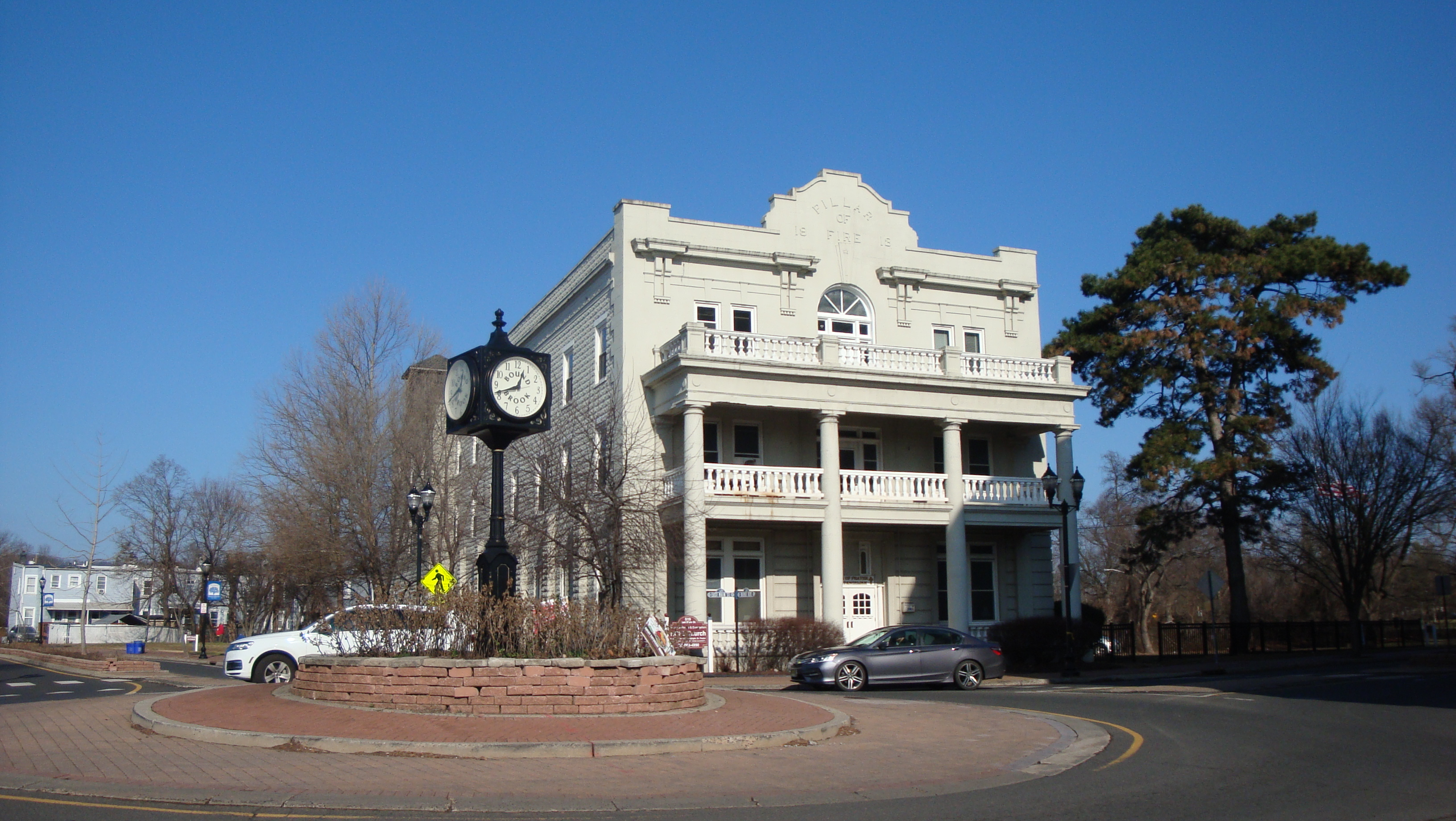
Clock at roundabout viewed from south

Route 28 travels east–west through the center of Bound Brook, while U.S. Route 22 clips the northern portion of the borough. County Routes 525, 527, 533 also pass through.

Interstate 287 is accessible to the west via Route 28 in bordering Bridgewater Township.

=== Public transportation ===
Train service in the borough is available at the Bound Brook station. NJ Transit provides commuter rail service on the Raritan Valley Line to Newark Penn Station. The historic station building on the north side of the tracks is located at 350 E. Main Street and was constructed in 1913. It is now a restaurant; the other station building on the south side is now privately owned. A pedestrian tunnel connects the south and north sides of the tracks. There are also Conrail tracks going past the station, used for freight trains to and from Newark.

NJ Transit offers bus service to and from the Port Authority Bus Terminal in Midtown Manhattan on the 114 and 117 routes, along with local service to Newark on the 65 and 66 routes.

Somerset County offers DASH, CAT, and SCOOT routes, providing service to destinations including Franklin Township, New Brunswick, Raritan, Manville and Hillsborough Township, as well as Bridgewater Commons and Raritan Valley Community College.

=== Bound Brook Cycling Classic ===
Every year, the Borough of Bound Brook hosts a nationally competitive bicycle race, the Bound Brook Cycling Classic, that on the same weekend, precedes the neighboring final purse contest, as part of the three-day Tour of Somerville, held annually on Memorial Day Weekend. The contest in Somerville was begun in 1940 by Fred “Pop” Kugler.

== Natural disasters ==
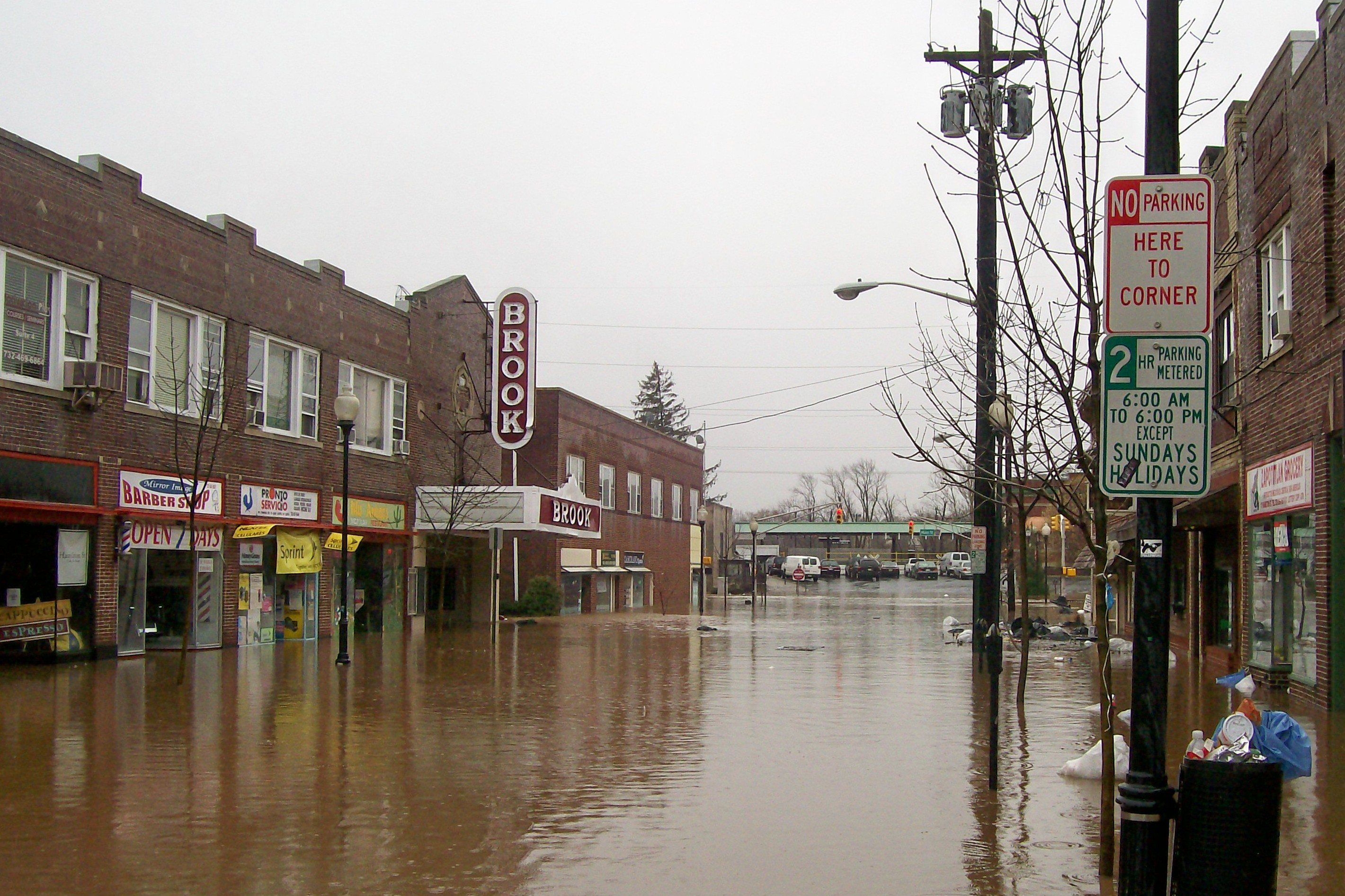
Downtown after April 2007 nor'easter, before completing Bound Brook portion of Green Brook Flood Control Project.

The lower downtown area of Bound Brook has been associated with flooding of the Raritan River. In September 1999, many structures near the commercial zone were damaged or destroyed by record Raritan floods resulting from Hurricane Floyd. This disaster reinvigorated a long-planned effort called the Green Brook Flood Control Project that would protect Bound Brook from up to a 150-year flooding event from the Raritan River and its tributaries, the Middle Brook and Green Brook that form the western and eastern boundaries of the town. During 1999–2015, the United States Army Corps of Engineers implemented extensive flood control measures to provide protection from future floods, which eliminated flood insurance requirements for a majority of Bound Brook and spurred revitalization of the downtown area.

The highest flooding level since 1800 in Bound Brook was reached during Hurricane Floyd in September 1999 – 42.13 feet (12.84 m), according to the United States Geological Survey—nearly matched by Tropical Storm Doria in August 1971, the April 2007 nor'easter and Hurricane Irene in August 2011. Main Street was also flooded in July 1938, September 1938, August 1955, August 1973, October 1996, and March 2010.

Bound Brook's downtown flooding led to several out-of-control fires over its history, including the fires of 1881 and 1887, which led to the formation of the Bound Brook Fire Department. In 1896, flooding likely caused the lime in the L.D. Cook lumberyard to ignite and the resulting fire spread to and destroyed the Presbyterian church. During Hurricane Floyd in 1999, a fire began in Otto Williams Harley Davidson on Main Street. With the building cut off by flood water, the fire spread quickly to two other structures before the Bound Brook Fire Department could contain it, then under the command of Chief Richard S. Colombaroni. Using fire boats from the New York City Fire Department as well as extensive help from mutual aid companies, the fire was stopped before two other buildings on Main Street and others nearby on Mountain Avenue, could be affected.

During the April 2007 Nor'easter, the Bound Brook Fire Department stopped another fire from spreading through an area of close residential construction. Under the command of Chief James Knight, and again with the assistance of mutual aid companies including the Finderne Fire Department, fire loss was restricted to three residential buildings.

On January 12, 2020, a seven-alarm fire set by an arsonist ripped through commercial buildings in the downtown area, causing $52 million in damages to buildings and displacing 15 residents.

== Notable people ==
People who were born in, residents of, or otherwise closely associated with Bound Brook include:

- Isaac Blackford (1786–1859), Indiana Supreme Court Justice
- Margaret Bourke-White (1904–1971), photographer
- Jeffrey Chiesa (born 1965), 59th Attorney General of New Jersey and interim United States Senator from New Jersey
- John G. Demaray (1930–2015), medievalist
- Dmytro Dontsov (1883-1973), Ukrainian nationalist who influenced the OUN, buried in Bound Brook
- Margit Feldman (1929–2020), public speaker, educator, activist, and Holocaust survivor
- Patrick X. Gallagher (1935–2019), mathematician and Columbia University professor
- William P. Gottlieb (1917–2006), jazz musician and photographer
- Sylvester Graham (1794–1851), Presbyterian minister and inventor of the Graham cracker
- William Griffith (1766–1826), judge who served on the United States circuit court
- William H. Johnson (stage name Zip the Pinhead; 1857–1926), freak show and circus performer
- Victor L. King (1886–1958), chemist
- George M. La Monte (1863–1927), businessman, politician, and philanthropist
- Dick Lynch (1936–2008), NFL defensive back who played for the Washington Redskins and the New York Giants
- James Augustine McFaul (1850–1917), Bishop of the Roman Catholic Diocese of Trenton from 1894 to 1917
- Ronald Naldi (born 1941/42), singer at the Metropolitan Opera
- William E. Ozzard (1915–2002), President of the New Jersey Senate and the New Jersey Board of Public Utilities
- George Pfister (1918–1997), Major League Baseball executive
- Jason Ryan (born 1976), MLB pitcher who played for the Minnesota Twins
- Upton Sinclair (1878–1968), muckraker-writer
- Samuel Swan (1771–1844), physician and U.S. Congressman
- William C. Thompson (1889–1963), cinematographer
- Henry Trefflich (1908–1978), wild animal importer and dealer
- Perry Wilson (1916–2009), actress who appeared in the film Fear Strikes Out

== See also ==
- Brook Industrial Park Superfund Site
