= Bonygutt Brook =

Tributary of Green Brook River in New Jersey, U.S.

Location
- Country: United States
- State: New Jersey
- County: Middlesex

Physical characteristics
- Source: Plainfield, New Jersey
  - location: Plainfield, New Jersey
  - coordinates: 40°35′43″N 74°26′48″W
- Mouth: Green Brook
  - location: Middlesex, New Jersey
  - coordinates: 40°35′13″N 74°29′21″W
  - elevation: 39 ft (12 m)

Bonygutt Brook is a tributary of Green Brook in Union and Middlesex Counties, New Jersey in the United States.

Bonygutt Brook flows from the city of Plainfield to Middlesex.

== See also ==
- List of rivers of New Jersey
