= Ambrose Brook =

River in New Jersey, United States

Coordinates: 40.559825°N 74.525155°W

Ambrose Brook is a tributary of Green Brook in Middlesex County, New Jersey in the United States.

It rises underneath Route 27 in Edison. It then flows into Lake Papaianni. It continues flowing northwest, parallel to County Route 529. After crossing Route 529 and Ethel Road West, it forms a border to some businesses in Piscataway, including William Kenyon and Sons, Inc. Upon flowing into Lake Nelson, the brook takes a more westerly route into Ambrose Doty's Park. Doty's Brook flows into it near Behmer Road in Piscataway. It then flows through undeveloped land as it crosses Interstate 287 near Possumtown Road. It continues flowing west into the pond at Victor Crowell Park in Middlesex The brook then takes a southwest turn and flows into the Green Brook near Lincoln Boulevard in Middlesex just before the Raritan River.

== See also ==
- List of rivers of New Jersey
