= Green Brook =

Tributary of the Raritan River in central New Jersey

- Along the border of Green Brook Township and Middlesex Borough

Location
- Country: United States

Physical characteristics
- Source
  - coordinates: 40°39′24″N 74°26′40″W
  - elevation: 410 ft (120 m)
- Mouth
  - coordinates: 40°35′3″N 74°30′8″W
  - elevation: 18 ft (5.5 m)

Basin features
- Progression: Raritan River, Atlantic Ocean
- River system: Raritan River system
- Tributaries
  - left: Blue Brook, Bonygutt Brook, Bound Brook, Ambrose Brook
  - right: Stony Brook

Green Brook is a tributary of the Raritan River in central New Jersey in the United States.

== Course ==
The Green Brook rises in the Watchung Mountains at an elevation of 417 feet in Free Acres, (the border of Berkeley Heights and Warren). It flows northeast, forming a border between Union and Somerset Counties. It then turns south and flows through a valley in the Watchung Mountains. The Blue Brook joins it at Seeley’s Pond. It continues on a southwestern flow through Plainfield/North Plainfield. It flows underground between Watchung Ave and Madison Ave. The Stony Brook joins it in Green Brook Park. It continues on a southwestern flow through Dunellen/Greenbrook, forming a border between Middlesex and Somerset Counties. The Bonygutt Brook joins it at the intersection of Warrenville Road in Middlesex. The Bound Brook joins it in the northwest corner of Mountain View Park in Middlesex. It continues flowing southwest and turns south before the Ambrose Brook joins it at the intersection of Lincoln Blvd. in Middlesex. It completes its journey by flowing into the Raritan River in Middlesex/Bound Brook at an elevation of 18 feet. It gives its name to the township of Green Brook, New Jersey.

== Green Brook Flood Control Project ==
The Green Brook Flood Control Project in Somerset County in central New Jersey was first proposed in the early 1970s in the wake of two major floods in June 1971 and August 1973, which caused millions of dollars of property damage and several deaths along the Green Brook and Raritan Rivers. The proposed flood control measures are expected to help control flooding in the Green Brook basin and parts of the Raritan River basin in Bound Brook, partially located in a natural floodplain of the Raritan River at the junction of the Green Brook and Raritan River.

The project has languished for decades due to a lack of federal funding and interest. Hurricane Floyd in 1999 caused additional property damage and deaths in the Green Brook basin, renewing interest in the flood control project. Some construction related to the project has been completed since 1999, particularly in Bound Brook, but federal funding limitations have slowed progress in recent years.

== Tributaries ==
- Blue Brook
- Bonygutt Brook
- Stony Brook
- Bound Brook
- Ambrose Brook

== See also ==
- List of rivers of New Jersey
