= Somerset Hills =

Region of New Jersey, United States

The Somerset Hills is the northern region of Somerset County, New Jersey including the townships of Bedminster, Bernards Township, Bernardsville, Far Hills boro, and Peapack & Gladstone.

The Somerset Hills is known as the northern region of Somerset County located in the central portion of the U.S. state of New Jersey and includes the municipalities of Bedminster, Bernardsville, Bernards Township, Far Hills, and Peapack-Gladstone. The neighboring municipalities of the Chesters (Borough and Township) and the Mendhams (Borough and Township) in southwestern Morris County are periodically recognized as part of the Somerset Hills.

The Somerset Hills is in the northern section of Somerset County that was created on May 14, 1688, from portions of Middlesex County.

The term was coined in the early 1800s and references the 2nd Watchung Mountain which crosses Bedminster as well as the Bernardsville Mountain that is the highest mountain in the region.

== Geography ==
The Somerset Hills region is located between two historic centers: Somerville (located on the Raritan River) to the south and Morristown to the north. Each serves as the county seat for Somerset County and Morris County. Both communities feature commercial centers and industrial areas and can be reached via Interstate 287.

The high point in the Somerset Hills is on Mine Mountain in Bernardsville, at approximately 860 feet (260 m) above sea level.

=== Adjacent municipalities ===
Somerset Hills contains the following municipalities:

- Peapack-Gladstone – north
- Bernards Township – east (Includes towns of Basking Ridge, Liberty Corner, W. Millington, Lyons)
- Bernardsville – central
- Bedminster – west (Includes towns of Lamington, Pottersville, Pluckemin, Larger Cross, Lesser Cross
- Far Hills – central

=== Adjacent counties ===
The Somerset Hills border the following counties:

- Morris County – north
- Union County – east
- Hunterdon County – west

== Climate and weather ==
In recent years, average temperatures in the county seat of Somerville have ranged from a low of 18 °F (−8 °C) in January to a high of 85 °F (29 °C) in July, although a record low of −16 °F (−27 °C) was recorded in January 1984 and a record high of 105 °F (41 °C) was recorded in August 1955. Average monthly precipitation ranged from 2.84 inches (72 mm) in February to 4.83 inches (123 mm) in July. The county has a humid continental climate which is hot-summer (Dfa) except on Mine Mountain west of Bernardsville where it is warm-summer (Dfb).

== History ==
The Somerset Hills is the northern section of Somerset County, New Jersey and is part of one of America's oldest counties and is named after the English county of Somerset. Most of the early residents were Dutch, Scottish and German. General George Washington and his troops marched through the area on several occasions and slept in many of the homes located throughout the area.

For much of its history, the Somerset Hills area was primarily an agricultural county. In the late 19th century, the Somerset Hills area became a popular country home location for wealthy industrialists. The area is still the home of wealthy pharmaceutical industrialists.

In the 1960s, townships that were once exclusively agricultural were quickly transformed into suburban communities. This growth was aided by the development of the county's very strong pharmaceutical and technology presence. More recently, there has been an influx of New York City commuters who use NJ Transit's Gladstone Branch or use Interstate 78.

== Historic events ==
The Somerset Hills played host to a number of events that changed the course of history in the United States. The area hosted three winter encampments for the Continental Army during the Revolutionary War. The first was in 1776 in nearby Bernardsville and Morristown, and the other two were winter encampments in nearby Middlebrook. During the winter of 1778-1779 General Henry Knox and over 1000 artillery troops spent the winter in Pluckemin, New Jersey at what is now known as America's First Military Academy, created 28 years before the founding of the US Military Academy at West Point. Another notable events was the capture of General Charles Lee at the Widow White's tavern in Basking Ridge on December 13, 1776. If it were not for this capture, Lee might have been selected the "father of our country."

In 1779, General Washington wrote General William Alexander, the Earl of Stirling to construct a series of signal beacons to warn the continental army if there was detected movement of the British troops moving west from New York City and Staten Island. This chain of beacons proved effective during the battle of Springfield. These Rev War beacons were remembered during the 225th anniversary of the British Evacuation day on November 25, 2008.

== Historic landmarks ==
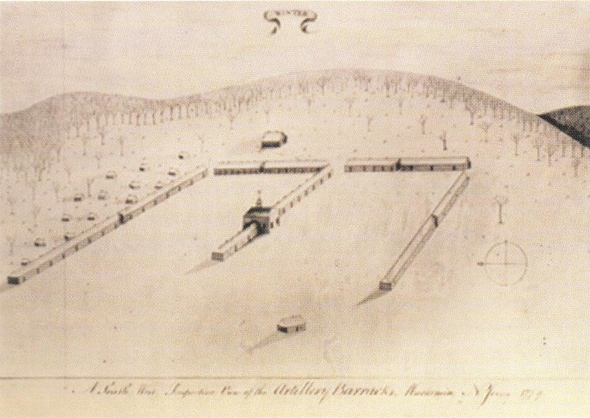
The Pluckemin Cantonment was built by the artillery forces for General Henry Knox during the winter of 1778-1779 in the village of Pluckemin (Bedminster, New Jersey). The drawing is referred to the John Lillie drawing and is in possession of the National Park Service in Morristown, New Jersey

The northern section of Somerset County in the Somerset Hills is rich in history dating back prior to the Revolutionary War.

- Bedminster
  - Hamilton Farm Stable Complex
  - Jacobus Vanderveer House
  - Lamington Historic District
  - McDonald's-Kline's Mill
  - Pluckemin Continental Artillery Cantonment Site
  - Pluckemin Village Historic District
  - Pottersville Village Historic District
- Bernards Township
  - Alward Farmhouse
  - Basking Ridge Presbyterian Church
  - Brick Academy
  - Basking Ridge Historic District
  - Coffee House
  - Franklin Corners Historic District
  - Kennedy Martin Stelle Farmstead - Bernards Township
  - Liberty Corner Historic District (Annin's Corner)
  - Lord Stirling Manor Site
  - Lyons Veterans Administration Hospital Historic District
  - Lyons Train Station - Lyons section of Bernards Township
  - Boudinout, Southard, Ross Farmstead - Basking Ridge Section of Bernards Township
- Bernardsville
  - Bernardsville Train Station - Bernardsville
  - John Parker Tavern
  - Olcott Historic District
  - Reynolds-Scherman House
  - St. Bernard's Church and Parish House
- Far Hills
  - Far Hills Train Station
- Peapack
  - Peapack Train Station
- Gladstone
  - Gladstone Train Station

== Parks and recreation ==
Somerset County parks include Lord Stirling Park (part of the Great Swamp National Wildlife Refuge), the Environmental Education Commission and the region is one of the largest equestrian areas in the United States. Home to the United States Equestrian Team Foundation next to the Hamilton Farm Golf Club, the area has one of the oldest fox hunting organizations, the Essex Hunt Club in Peapack, New Jersey.

Trump National Golf Club in Bedminster is an exclusive golf club owned by Donald Trump. The facility has also served as the 45th President's Summer Whitehouse. Two other golf clubs are the Somerset Hills Country Club in Bernardsville, and Fiddlers Elbow Country Club in Bedminster, New Jersey. The United States Golfing Association (USGA) and museum is also located in Bernards Township, New Jersey.

One of the largest equestrian events in the United States is the Far Hills Race Meeting held annually in Far Hills, New Jersey. Known also as "The Hunt" it is one of the most prestigious steeplechase races in the United States. It is also one of the largest events in the county as the borough grows to over 25,000 on the October Saturday. In 2020, the FHRM will celebrate its 100th running.

== Government ==
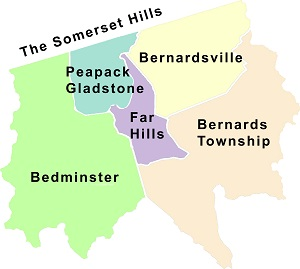
The Somerset Hills Region of Northern Somerset County, New Jersey

While part of Somerset County, each of the Somerset Hills townships are governed by their own separate government bodies. However, there are a number of shared government services that are shared between townships in the Somerset Hills. Somerset County is governed by a five-member Board of Chosen Freeholders, whose members are elected at-large to three-year terms of office on a staggered basis, with one or two seats coming up for election each year. At the federal level, the towns are all located within New Jersey's 7th congressional district, currently represented by Republican Tom Kean, Jr.

== Education ==
Townships within the Somerset Hills are overseen by individual public schools for elementary thru middle school. The Somerset Hills area is home to two public high schools:

- Ridge High School serves public school students from Bernards Township
- Bernards High School serves public school students from Bedminster, Bernardsville, Far Hills, and Peapack & Gladstone operating under the Somerset Hills School District

== Municipalities ==
Municipalities in the Somerset Hills (with 2010 Census data for population, housing units and area) are listed below.

| Municipality | Mun. type | Pop. | Housing Units | Total Area | Water Area | Land Area | Pop. Density | Housing Density | School District | Communities |
|---|---|---|---|---|---|---|---|---|---|---|
| Bedminster; Township | Township | 8,165 | 4,349 | 26.30 | 0.22 | 26.08 | 313.1 | 166.8 | Somerset Hills (9-12) (S/R); Bedminster Township (PK-8) | Lamington Larger Cross Lesser Cross; Pluckemin; Pottersville |
| Bernards; Township | Township | 26,652 | 10,103 | 24.06 | 0.13 | 23.93 | 1,113.6 | 422.1 | Bernards Township | Basking Ridge Franklin Corners; Liberty Corner; Lyons Madisonville W. Millington |
| Bernardsville | Borough | 7,707 | 2,871 | 12.98 | 0.08 | 12.91 | 597.2 | 222.5 | Somerset Hills | |
| Far Hills | Borough | 919 | 418 | 4.88 | 0.08 | 4.80 | 191.6 | 87.1 | Somerset Hills | |
| Peapack-Gladstone | Borough | 2,582 | 949 | 5.85 | 0.04 | 5.81 | 444.5 | 163.4 | Somerset Hills | Gladstone |

=== 07931 ===
The 07931 ZIP Code extends beyond the borders of Far Hills into sections of other nearby Somerset Hills communities in Somerset and Morris counties including the boroughs of Bernardsville and Peapack-Gladstone; along with the townships of Bedminster, Bernards, Chester, and Mendham.

== Transportation ==
=== Roads and highways ===
The Somerset Hills area is served by a number of different routes. U.S. Routes include U.S. Route 202 and U.S. Route 206. The two Interstates that pass through are Interstate 78 and Interstate 287.

=== Public transportation ===
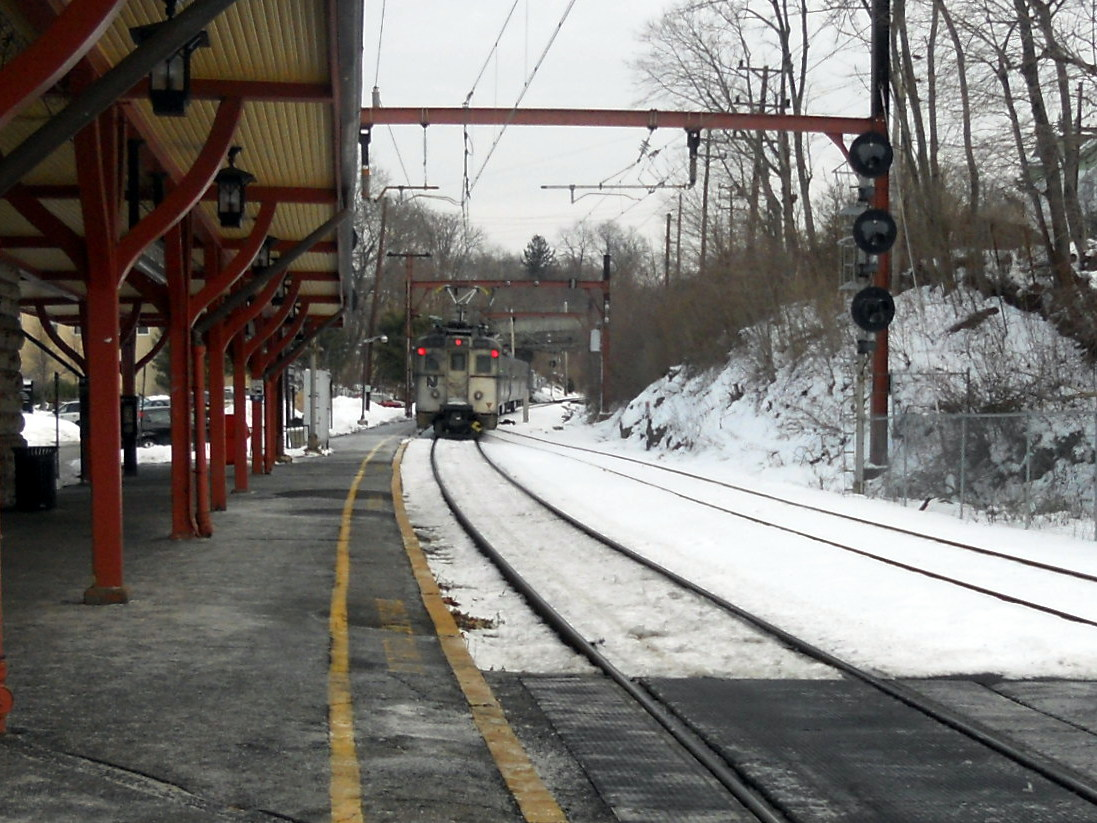
Bernardsville station

NJ Transit provides train service on the Gladstone Branch Public bus transportation is provided by several transit agencies.

NJ Transit provides bus service to the Port Authority Bus Terminal in Midtown Manhattan, as well as service to major cities in New Jersey and within Somerset County. Ridewise provides three SCOOT shuttles as well as DASH buses and CAT buses.

=== Airports ===
There three closest airports are the Somerset Airport (small plane) in Bedminster, Morristown Municipal Airport (Mid) and Newark Liberty International Airport in Newark / Elizabeth
