= Montgomery High School (New Jersey) =

High school in Somerset County, New Jersey, United States

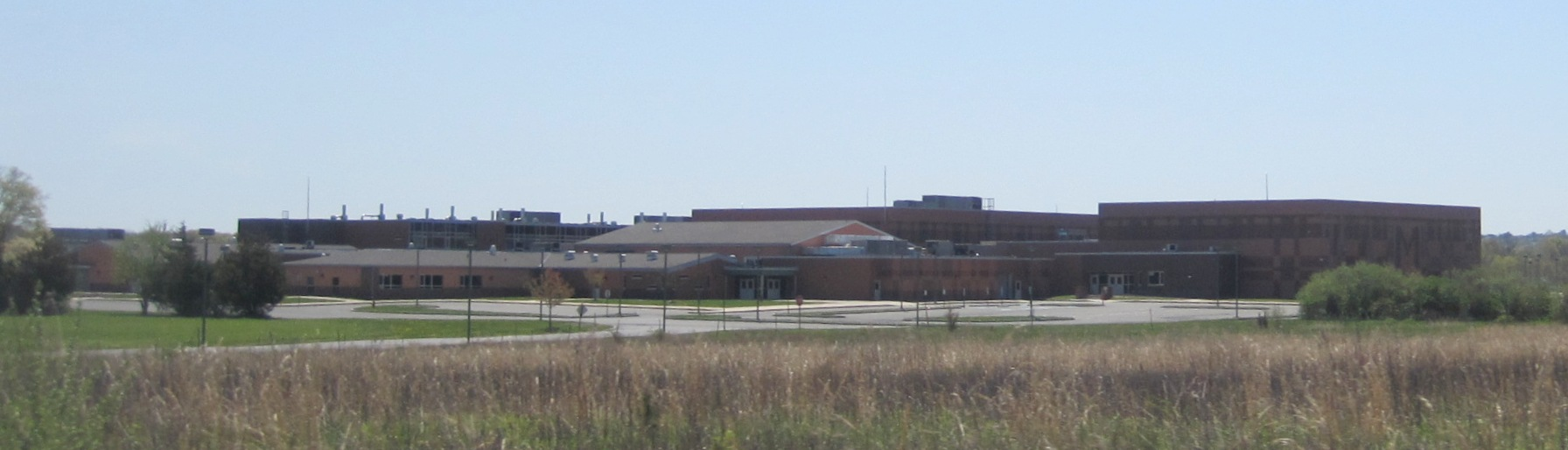
- School as seen from Skillman Road

Location
- 1016 Route 601; Montgomery Township, New Jersey 08558; United States; 40.417368°N 74.702353°W

Information
- Type: Comprehensive public high school
- Established: 1969
- School district: Montgomery Township School District
- NCES School ID: 341059005250
- Principal: Heather Pino-Beattie>
- Faculty: 122.3 FTEs
- Grades: 9–12
- Enrollment: 1,611 (as of 2024–25)
- Student to teacher ratio: 13.2:1
- Campus: Rural
- Colors: Green and Gold
- Athletics conference: Skyland Conference (general); Big Central Football Conference (football)
- Team name: Cougars
- Newspaper: The Pawprint
- Yearbook: The Lens
- Website: mhs.mtsd.k12.nj.us

Montgomery High School is a four-year comprehensive public high school located in the Skillman section of Montgomery Township, in Somerset County, in the U.S. state of New Jersey, serving students in ninth through twelfth grades as the lone secondary school of the Montgomery Township School District.

As of the 2024–25 school year, the school had an enrollment of 1,611 students and 122.3 classroom teachers (on an FTE basis), for a student–teacher ratio of 13.2:1. There were 107 students (6.6% of enrollment) eligible for free lunch and 19 (1.2% of students) eligible for reduced-cost lunch.

The district's District Factor Group ranking of "J" indicated that the school serves students of relatively high socioeconomic status.

== History ==
After the Princeton Public Schools announced that it could not accommodate students, the Montgomery district had sought the possibility of a regional high school with the Hillsborough Township School District and also sought other sending-receiving relationships.

Ground was broken in April 1968 for a building that would accommodate an enrollment of 1,100 students and be constructed at a cost of $3.3 million (equivalent to $30.8 million in 2025). The original high school opened in January 1969 for students in grades 7–10, before which students from the township attended Princeton High School under the terms of a sending/receiving relationship. A new high school building opened for the 2005–06 school year.

The school had been accredited by the Middle States Association of Colleges and Schools Commission on Elementary and Secondary Schools from 1976 until 2013, when the school's accreditation status was removed.

== Awards, recognition and rankings ==
For the 1992–93 school year, Montgomery High School was awarded the National Blue Ribbon School Award of Excellence by the United States Department of Education, the highest award an American school can receive.

In the 2011 "Ranking America's High Schools" issue by The Washington Post, the school was ranked 13th in New Jersey and 636th nationwide. The school was ranked 643rd nationwide, the 18th-highest in New Jersey, in Newsweek magazine's 2010 rankings of America's Best High Schools. In Newsweek's May 22, 2007, issue, ranking the country's top high schools, Montgomery High School was listed in 656th place, the 13th-highest ranked school in New Jersey.

Montgomery High School was ranked 21st by U.S. News & World Report in its 2026–27 edition of Best New Jersey High Schools and ranked 356th in the publication's national rankings.

The school was the 33rd-ranked public high school in New Jersey out of 339 schools statewide in New Jersey Monthly magazine's September 2014 cover story on the state's "Top Public High Schools," using a new ranking methodology. The school had been ranked 61st in the state of 328 schools in 2012, after being ranked 10th in 2010 out of 322 schools listed. The magazine ranked the school 16th in 2008 out of 316 schools. The school was ranked 4th in the magazine's September 2006 issue, which included 316 schools across the state.

Schooldigger.com ranked the school 39th out of 381 public high schools statewide in its 2011 rankings (a decrease of 7 positions from the 2010 ranking) which were based on the combined percentage of students classified as proficient or above proficient on the mathematics (93.3%) and language arts literacy (98.1%) components of the High School Proficiency Assessment (HSPA).

== Testing ==
Montgomery was recognized in 2006 as excellent in Advanced Placement Art History; all 203 students who took the AP exam that year scored 3 (out of 5) or above.

=== SAT Scores ===
In 2005–06, Montgomery averaged a 1760 combined SAT score, 15th-highest statewide, and ranked 7th among all non-magnet, general admission public high schools. In 2006–07, Montgomery averaged a 1755 SAT score, 14th-highest in the state and the 7th-highest for any non-magnet, general admission public high school.

== Student activities ==
Student Aaron Chai of the class of 2025 was a gold medalist at the International Linguistics Olympiad

=== Science Olympiad ===
Science Olympiad in Montgomery is run by the teachers in the Science department. From 1997 to 2005, the school won the New Jersey state championships nine consecutive times, qualifying for the national tournament each time. The ten state titles are tied with West Windsor-Plainsboro High School South for the most titles of any high school in the state.

== Athletics ==
The Montgomery High School Cougars compete a member of the Skyland Conference, which includes public and private high schools covering Hunterdon County, Somerset County and Warren County in west Central Jersey, and operates under the jurisdiction of the New Jersey State Interscholastic Athletic Association (NJSIAA). With 1,232 students in grades 10–12, the school was classified by the NJSIAA for the 2019–20 school year as Group IV for most athletic competition purposes, which included schools with an enrollment of 1,060 to 5,049 students in that grade range. The football team competes in Division 4 of the Big Central Football Conference, which includes 60 public and private high schools in Hunterdon, Middlesex, Somerset, Union and Warren counties, which are broken down into 10 divisions by size and location. The school was classified by the NJSIAA as Group IV North for football for 2024–2026, which included schools with 893 to 1,315 students. Sports offered at Montgomery High School include golf, wrestling, soccer, cross country running, baseball, football, ice hockey, field hockey, basketball, lacrosse, softball, swimming, gymnastics, fencing, cheerleading, girls' volleyball, and track.

The school participates in a joint ice hockey team with Hopewell Valley Central High School as the host school / lead agency. The co-op program operates under agreements scheduled to expire at the end of the 2023–24 school year.

The 1991 boys soccer team finished the season with a record of 14-4-2 after winning the Group I state championship with a 1–0 win against Glen Rock High School in the final game of the tournament at Trenton State College.

The boys' tennis team won the Group IV state championship in 1993 (vs. Haddonfield Memorial High School), 1997 (vs. Pitman High School), 1998 (vs. Madison High School) and 1999 (vs. Haddonfield), and won the Group IV title in 2017 (vs. Livingston High School), 2018 (vs. Westfield High School) and 2019 (vs. Montclair High School). The team won the Tournament of Champions in 2017 (defeating runner-up Newark Academy in the final match of the tournament), 2018 (vs. West Windsor-Plainsboro High School South) and 2019 (vs. Newark Academy). The 2019 team won the Group IV state title over Montclair 5–0 in the tournament final and went on to finish the season 23–0 after winning the Tournament of Champions over Newark Academy 3–2 in the final round.

The girls swimming team won the Public Group B state championship in 2004 and the Public B title in 2015. The boys team won the Public Group B title in 2020.

The girls soccer team was the Group III co-champion in 2005 with Moorestown High School and won the Group IV state championship with a 1–0 win over Ridge High School in 2012.

The ice hockey team won the Dowd Cup in 2003.

The girls' softball team won the 2004 NJSIAA Group III state championship. They also won the 2009 Somerset County Tournament.

The boys and girls track teams won the 2005 North II Group III state championships.

The baseball team won the 2005 North II Group III state championship with a 3–1 win over Millburn High School.

The boys lacrosse team won the Group III state championship in 2007 (defeating Randolph High School in the tournament final), and won the Group IV title in 2017 (vs. Ridgewood High School) and 2019 (vs. Hunterdon Central Regional High School). The team won the 2007 Group III state championship with a 10–8 win in the playoff finals over Randolph High School.

The 2007 girls' tennis team won the Central Jersey, Group IV state sectional championship with a 3–2 win over West Windsor-Plainsboro High School South in the tournament final. The team won the Group I state championship in 1994 vs. Verona High School and 1996 vs. Mountain Lakes High School. The team won the Group II championship in 2002 vs. Summit High School.

The boys' basketball team won their first Central Jersey Group IV sectional title in 2010 with a 57–30 win over North Brunswick Township High School, and have won the Central Jersey Group IV sectional title in 2024, and 2025. The team have also won their respective conference championship in 1975, 2000, 2001, 2003, 2010, 2012, 2013, 2014, 2019, 2024 and 2025.

The 2010 boys' tennis team won the Central Jersey Group IV sectional title with a 3–2 win over West Windsor-Plainsboro High School South.

The girls' fencing team was the overall state champion in 2016 and 2022, won the épée team state title in 2011 and 2019, and was the foil team winner in 2016 and 2017.

The 2011, 2012 and 2015 boys' golf teams won the Central/South Group IV state sectional championship.

The boys' fencing team was the foil team state champion in 2019.

== Administration ==
The school's principal is Heather Pino-Beattie. Her core administrative team includes three vice principals.

== Notable alumni ==
- Anthony Cassar (born 1996) freestyle and folkstyle wrestler, NCAA Division I champion at Penn State
- Chris Chugunov (born 1997, class of 2015), quarterback who played for the West Virginia Mountaineers and the Ohio State Buckeyes
- Kevin East (born 1971, class of 1989) retired soccer goalkeeper who is coach of the Rutgers University–Newark men's soccer team
- Mike Ford (born 1992), first baseman for the Seattle Mariners
- Brandon Grosso (born 2000), professional stock car racing driver who has competed in the ARCA Menards Series
- Gavin Hollowell (born 1997), professional baseball pitcher for the Colorado Rockies
- Brett MacConnell (born 1986/87), college basketball coach
- John Milhiser (born 1981, class of 2000), actor and comedian who was a cast member on Saturday Night Live for the 2013–2014 season
- Dave Wasserman (born 1984, class of 2002), Senior Editor, U.S. House of Representatives for The Cook Political Report
- Mark Wiltse (born 1988) soccer defender and midfielder who played for the Charleston Battery of the USL Professional Division

== Notable faculty ==
- Yannick Smith (born 1990), former professional soccer player, who has been a health and phys ed teacher and a coach at the school
