= Zion, New Jersey =

Populated place in Somerset County, New Jersey, US

Zion
- Unincorporated community
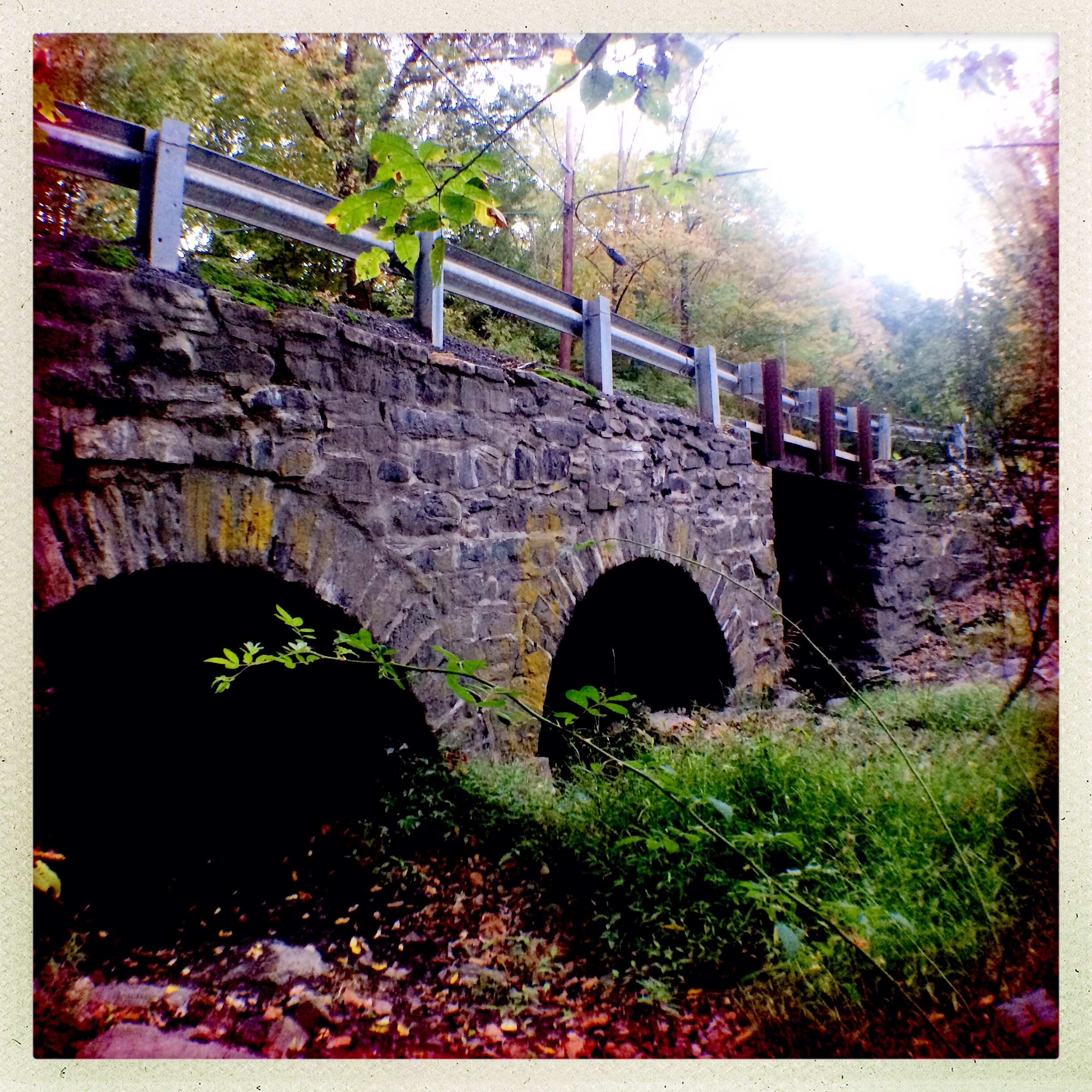
- Rock Brook Bridge in Zion

- Location of Zion in Somerset County. Inset: Location of Somerset County within the state of New Jersey. Zion (New Jersey) Zion (the United States)
- Coordinates: 40°26′26″N 74°44′19″W
- Country: United States
- State: New Jersey
- County: Somerset
- Township: Hillsborough and Montgomery
- Elevation: 364 ft (111 m)
- Time zone: UTC−05:00 (Eastern (EST))
  - Summer (DST): UTC−04:00 (EDT)
- GNIS feature ID: 881993

Zion is an unincorporated community along the border of Hillsborough Township and Montgomery Township in Somerset County, in the U.S. state of New Jersey. It is located on Rock Brook, approximately 3 mi (4.8 km) north of Hopewell.

The Rock Brook Bridge in Zion is listed on the National Register of Historic Places.
