= Bridgewater-Raritan Regional School District =

School district in Somerset County, New Jersey, US

Bridgewater-Raritan Regional District

Address
- 836 Newmans Lane Bridgewater Township, Somerset County, New Jersey, 08807; United States
- Coordinates: 40.602991°N 74.568287°W

District information
- Grades: PreK-12
- Superintendent: Robert Beers
- Business administrator: Kevin Lomski
- Schools: 11

Students and staff
- Enrollment: 8,254 (as of 2020–21)
- Faculty: 754.4 FTEs
- Student–teacher ratio: 10.9:1

Other information
- District Factor Group: I
- Website: www.brrsd.org
Ind.	Per pupil	District spending	Rank (*)	K-12 average	%± vs. average
1A	Total Spending	$17,614	39	$18,891	−6.8%
1	Budgetary Cost	14,439	50	14,783	−2.3%
2	Classroom Instruction	9,227	74	8,763	5.3%
6	Support Services	1,954	27	2,392	−18.3%
8	Administrative Cost	1,495	59	1,485	0.7%
10	Operations & Maintenance	1,465	33	1,783	−17.8%
13	Extracurricular Activities	260	56	268	−3.0%
16	Median Teacher Salary	65,128	53	64,043
Data from NJDoE 2014 Taxpayers' Guide to Education Spending. *Of K-12 districts with more than 3,500 students. Lowest spending=1; Highest=103

The Bridgewater–Raritan Regional School District is a regional public school district serving students in pre-kindergarten through twelfth grade from the municipalities of Bridgewater Township and Raritan Borough in Somerset County, in the U.S. state of New Jersey. All of the school facilities are in Bridgewater, except for John F. Kennedy School, which is located in Raritan.

As of the 2020–21 school year, the district, comprised of 11 schools, had an enrollment of 8,254 students and 754.4 classroom teachers (on an FTE basis), for a student–teacher ratio of 10.9:1. One of the largest suburban districts statewide, the district is the largest in Somerset County.

== History ==
Bridgewater-Raritan High School was opened in September 1959, with students in ninth and tenth grades; those students moving into eleventh and twelfth grades remained at Somerville High School. Increasing enrollments in the early 1960s led to the construction of a second high school in 1966, which was named Bridgewater-Raritan High School East (the Minutemen), while the original high school was renamed Bridgewater-Raritan High School West (the Golden Falcons). Declining enrollment led to their consolidation into a single high school during the 1990s. The former High School West was expanded and updated over a period of several years, during which all of the district's high school students attended what had been High School East. The former High School West reopened in 1992 as the new consolidated Bridgewater-Raritan High School, while the High School East became the district's middle school.

The district had been classified by the New Jersey Department of Education as being in District Factor Group "I", the second-highest of eight groupings. District Factor Groups organize districts statewide to allow comparison by common socioeconomic characteristics of the local districts. From lowest socioeconomic status to highest, the categories are A, B, CD, DE, FG, GH, I and J.

In February 2026, the school board announced that it had rejected the possibility of a merger with another district, though the prospective partner was not specified.

== Awards and recognition ==
During the 1999–2000 school year, Bridgewater–Raritan High School received the National Blue Ribbon Award of Excellence from the United States Department of Education, the highest honor that an American school can achieve.

For the 1997-98 school year, Bridgewater–Raritan High School was named a "Star School" by the New Jersey Department of Education, the highest honor that a New Jersey school can achieve.

BRHS is one of three high schools in the state to have received both awards.

Bridgewater Middle school students qualified to participate in NJ State and National Mathcounts for 2012 and 2013.

Bridgewater Middle School students placed first in the National Science Bowl 2013 New Jersey regional competition held at Princeton Plasma Lab; Science Bowl is a science competition sponsored by United States Department of Energy, involving general, physical, life, earth and mathematics.

The Bridgewater Middle School Academic team won the A.T.O.M.S tournament for six of eight years, in 2010, 2011, 2012, 2013, 2015 and 2017.

In 2015, BRMS swept all of the 30+ schools during the Music in the Parks Festival and came in first in Jazz band, wind ensemble, orchestra, and girls choir.

In 2013, the BRHS marching band placed the highest of any New Jersey marching band at the Bands of America national championships, and the second New Jersey band to make it to semi-finals.

== Schools ==
Schools in the district (with 2020–21 enrollment data from the National Center for Education Statistics) are:

Primary schools

- Adamsville Primary School (532 students; in grades PreK–4)
  - James Singagliese, principal
- Bradley Gardens Primary School (263; PreK–4)
  - Barbara A. Binford, principal
- Crim Primary School (342; K–4)
  - Kelliann Ten Kate, principal
- Hamilton Primary School (477; K–4)
  - Timothy Beaumont, principal
- John F. Kennedy Primary School (427; K–4)
  - Aldo Russo, principal
- Milltown Primary School (402; PreK–4)
  - Matthew J. Lembo, principal
- Van Holten Primary School (334; K–4)
  - George Rauh, principal

Intermediate and middle schools

- Eisenhower Intermediate School (704; 5–6)
  - Laura Bassett, principal
- Hillside Intermediate School (574; 5–6)
  - Tali Axelrod, principal
- Bridgewater–Raritan Middle School (1,384; 7–8)
  - Megan Corliss, principal

High school

- Bridgewater-Raritan High School (2,745; 9–12)
  - Daniel Hemberger, principal

== Former and converted schools ==
From 1966 until 1991, the Bridgewater–Raritan district had two high schools, known as "East" and "West." The current unified high school is on the "West" site, and the former "East" building is now the Middle School.

Schools that have been closed since the 1970s include:

- Finderne School (closed 1983; now the Peoplecare Center for non-profit community services)
- Green Knoll School (closed 1976; now part of the Bridgewater Township Municipal Building complex)
- Martinsville School (closed 1978; now occupied by private offices)
- Valley School (closed 1984; now the Harmon V. Wade Administration Building, school district headquarters)
- Washington Middle School in Raritan (closed 1979; converted to Somerset County offices)

Adamsville School, now an elementary school, was a middle school until 1983. Eisenhower and Hillside Schools, now intermediate schools, were both middle schools until 1995.

== District governance ==
=== Administration ===
Core members of the district's administration are:

- Robert Beers, superintendent
- Kevin Lomski, business administrator and board secretary

In October 2026, Superintendent Robert Beers was placed on a two-week administrative leave by the Board of Education after he used profanity in an email to a Board of Education member.

=== Board of education ===
The district's board of education is comprised of nine members who set policy and oversee the fiscal and educational operation of the district through its administration. As a Type II school district, the board's trustees are elected directly by voters to serve three-year terms of office on a staggered basis, with either one or two seats up for election each year held (since 2012) as part of the November general election. The board appoints a superintendent to oversee the district's day-to-day operations and a business administrator to supervise the business functions of the district. The district's nine-member board of education is apportioned by population between Bridgewater and Raritan. Since the early 1990s, Bridgewater has elected eight of the board members and Raritan has elected one. Board members serve three-year terms of office on a staggered basis, with three members up for election each year. For 2026, the board president is Michael Pepe of Raritan and the vice president is Rebecca Hassouna of Bridgewater.
