= Green Brook School District =

School district in Somerset County, New Jersey, US

Address
- 132 Jefferson Avenue Green Brook Township, Somerset County, New Jersey, 08812; United States
- Coordinates: 40.6035°N 74.466842°W

District information
- Grades: PreK-8
- Superintendent: Lisa Ferreira
- Business administrator: Jason Weber
- Schools: 2

Students and staff
- Enrollment: 711 (as of 2024–25)
- Faculty: 74.5 FTEs
- Student–teacher ratio: 9.5:1

Other information
- District Factor Group: GH
- Website: www.gbtps.org
Ind.	Per pupil	District spending	Rank (*)	K-8 average	%± vs. average
1A	Total Spending	$17,704	50	$18,891	−6.3%
1	Budgetary Cost	13,360	33	14,159	−5.6%
2	Classroom Instruction	7,616	14	8,659	−12.0%
6	Support Services	2,016	40	2,167	−7.0%
8	Administrative Cost	1,804	72	1,547	16.6%
10	Operations & Maintenance	1,448	36	1,612	−10.2%
13	Extracurricular Activities	181	79	104	74.0%
16	Median Teacher Salary	53,970	11	61,136
Data from NJDoE 2014 Taxpayers' Guide to Education Spending. *Of K-8 districts with more than 750 students. Lowest spending=1; Highest=84

The Green Brook School District is a community public school district that serves students in pre-kindergarten through eighth grade from Green Brook Township, in Somerset County, in the U.S. state of New Jersey.

As of the 2024–25 school year, the district, comprised of two schools, had an enrollment of 711 students and 74.5 classroom teachers (on an FTE basis), for a student–teacher ratio of 9.5:1.

The district had been classified by the New Jersey Department of Education as being in District Factor Group "GH", the third-highest of eight groupings. District Factor Groups organize districts statewide to allow comparison by common socioeconomic characteristics of the local districts. From lowest socioeconomic status to highest, the categories are A, B, CD, DE, FG, GH, I and J.

Green Brook's public school students in ninth through twelfth grades attend Watchung Hills Regional High School in Warren Township through a sending/receiving relationship. Students from Green Brook and from the neighboring communities of Watchung, Warren Township (in Somerset County), and Long Hill Township (in Morris County) attend the school. As of the 2024–25 school year, the high school had an enrollment of 1,653 students and 142.8 classroom teachers (on an FTE basis), for a student–teacher ratio of 11.6:1.

== Awards and recognition ==
For the 1998-99 school year, Irene E. Feldkirchner Elementary School was recognized with the National Blue Ribbon School Award from the United States Department of Education, the highest honor that an American school can achieve.

== Schools ==
Schools in the district (with 2024-25 enrollment data from the National Center for Education Statistics) are:

Elementary school

- Irene E. Feldkirchner Elementary School with 404 students in grades PreK-4
  - Crista Fenton, principal

Middle school

- Green Brook Middle School with 304 students in grades 5-8
  - Alicia Subervi, principal

== Administration ==
Core members of the district's administration are:

- Lisa Ferreira, superintendent of schools
- Jason Weber, business administrator and board secretary

== Board of education ==
The district's board of education is comprised of nine members who set policy and oversee the fiscal and educational operation of the district through its administration. As a Type II school district, the board's trustees are elected directly by voters to serve three-year terms of office on a staggered basis, with three seats up for election each year held (since 2012) as part of the November general election. The board appoints a superintendent to oversee the district's day-to-day operations and a business administrator to supervise the business functions of the district.
