= Watchung Borough Schools =

School district in Somerset County, New Jersey, US

Address
- One Parenty Way Watchung, Somerset County, 07069; United States
- Coordinates: 40.637763°N 74.459951°W

District information
- Grades: PreK-8
- Superintendent: Julie Glazer
- Business administrator: Karen Bishop Johnson
- Schools: 2

Students and staff
- Enrollment: 671 (as of 2022–23)
- Faculty: 62.5 FTEs
- Student–teacher ratio: 10.7:1

Other information
- District Factor Group: I
- Website: www.watchungschools.com
Ind.	Per pupil	District spending	Rank (*)	K-8 average	%± vs. average
1A	Total Spending	$18,763	36	$18,891	−0.7%
1	Budgetary Cost	13,302	19	14,159	−6.1%
2	Classroom Instruction	7,773	15	8,659	−10.2%
6	Support Services	2,086	26	2,167	−3.7%
8	Administrative Cost	1,612	27	1,547	4.2%
10	Operations & Maintenance	1,662	39	1,612	3.1%
13	Extracurricular Activities	114	30	104	9.6%
16	Median Teacher Salary	59,250	30	61,136
Data from NJDoE 2014 Taxpayers' Guide to Education Spending. *Of K-8 districts with 401-750 students. Lowest spending=1; Highest=64

The Watchung Borough Schools are a comprehensive community public school district, serving students in pre-kindergarten through eighth grade from Watchung, in Somerset County, in the U.S. state of New Jersey.

As of the 2022–23 school year, the district, comprised of two schools, had an enrollment of 671 students and 62.5 classroom teachers (on an FTE basis), for a student–teacher ratio of 10.7:1.

The district is classified by the New Jersey Department of Education as being in District Factor Group "I", the second-highest of eight groupings. District Factor Groups organize districts statewide to allow comparison by common socioeconomic characteristics of the local districts. From lowest socioeconomic status to highest, the categories are A, B, CD, DE, FG, GH, I and J.

Watchung's students in public school for ninth through twelfth grades attend Watchung Hills Regional High School in Warren Township together with students from the neighboring communities of Green Brook Township, through sending/receiving relationship, and Warren Township (in Somerset County) and Long Hill Township (in Morris County). As of the 2022–23 school year, the high school had an enrollment of 1,741 students and 150.8 classroom teachers (on an FTE basis), for a student–teacher ratio of 11.5:1.

== Schools ==
Schools in the district (with 2022–23 enrollment data from the National Center for Education Statistics) are:

Elementary school

- Bayberry Elementary School with 410 students in grades PreK – 4
  - Denise Fichner, principal

Middle school

- Valley View School with 254 students in grades 5 – 8
  - Karin Kidd, principal

== Administration ==
Core members of the district's administration are:

- Julie Glazer, superintendent
- Karen Bishop-Johnson, business administrator / board secretary

== Board of education ==
The district's board of education is comprised of nine members, who set policy and oversee the fiscal and educational operation of the district through its administration. As a Type II school district, the board's trustees are elected directly by voters to serve three-year terms of office on a staggered basis, with three seats up for election each year held (since 2012) as part of the November general election. The board appoints a superintendent to oversee the district's day-to-day operations and a business administrator to supervise the business functions of the district.
