= Gladstone, New Jersey =

Place in Somerset County, New Jersey, United States

- Unincorporated community
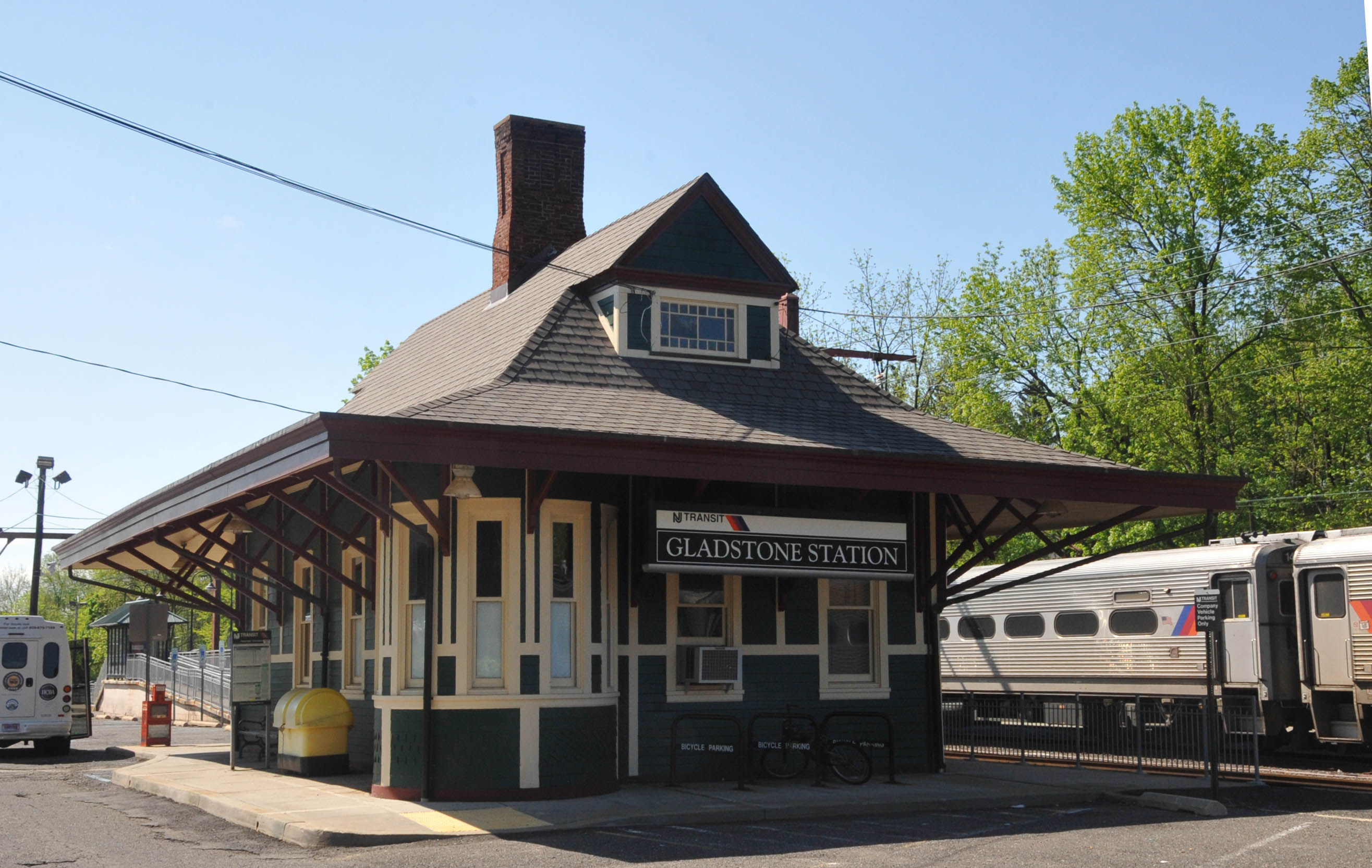
- Gladstone Station

- Location in Somerset County Location in New Jersey Location in the United States
- Coordinates: 40.7226007°N 74.6654381°W
- Country: United States
- State: New Jersey
- County: Somerset
- Borough: Peapack-Gladstone
- Elevation: 262 ft (80 m)

Population (2010)
  - Total: 1,501
- Time zone: UTC−05:00 (Eastern (EST))
  - Summer (DST): UTC−04:00 (Eastern (EDT))
- ZIP code: 07934
- GNIS feature ID: 876615

Gladstone is an unincorporated community located within Peapack-Gladstone in Somerset County, in the U.S. state of New Jersey. The area is served as United States Postal Service ZIP Code 07934. Gladstone was named in honor of William Ewart Gladstone, who served as British Prime Minister several times between 1868 and 1894.

The community is home to the Hamilton Farm Golf Club, the Stronghold Soccer Club, the United States Equestrian Team and the Gill St. Bernard's School, a private, nonsectarian, coeducational day school, serving students in pre-kindergarten through twelfth grade.

In the Forbes magazine 2017 ranking of the Most Expensive ZIP Codes in the United States, Gladstone was ranked as the 457th most expensive in the country, with its median home sale price of $938,042. In 2018, New Jersey Business Magazine listed Gladstone at 46th in its listing of "The Most Expensive ZIP Codes in New Jersey", with a median sale price 2017 of $627,500.

As of the 2010 United States census, the population for ZIP Code Tabulation Area 07934 was 1,501.

== Culture ==
Gladstone is home to the United States Equestrian Team and the Stronghold Soccer Club, which plays its matches at Mount St. John's on the grounds of Montgomery Academy.

The Hamilton Farm Golf Club is located in Gladstone and has been the site of the Sybase Match Play Championship since its inception in 2010. It is the only match play format event on the LPGA Tour.

== Education ==
As part of Peapack-Gladstone, residents of Gladstone are served by the Somerset Hills School District.

Located along the border with Chester Township is the Gill St. Bernard's School, a private, nonsectarian, coeducational day school, serving students in pre-kindergarten through twelfth grade. Situated on Pottersville Road and Route 206 is The Willow School, which serves students in preschool through eight grade.

== Transportation ==
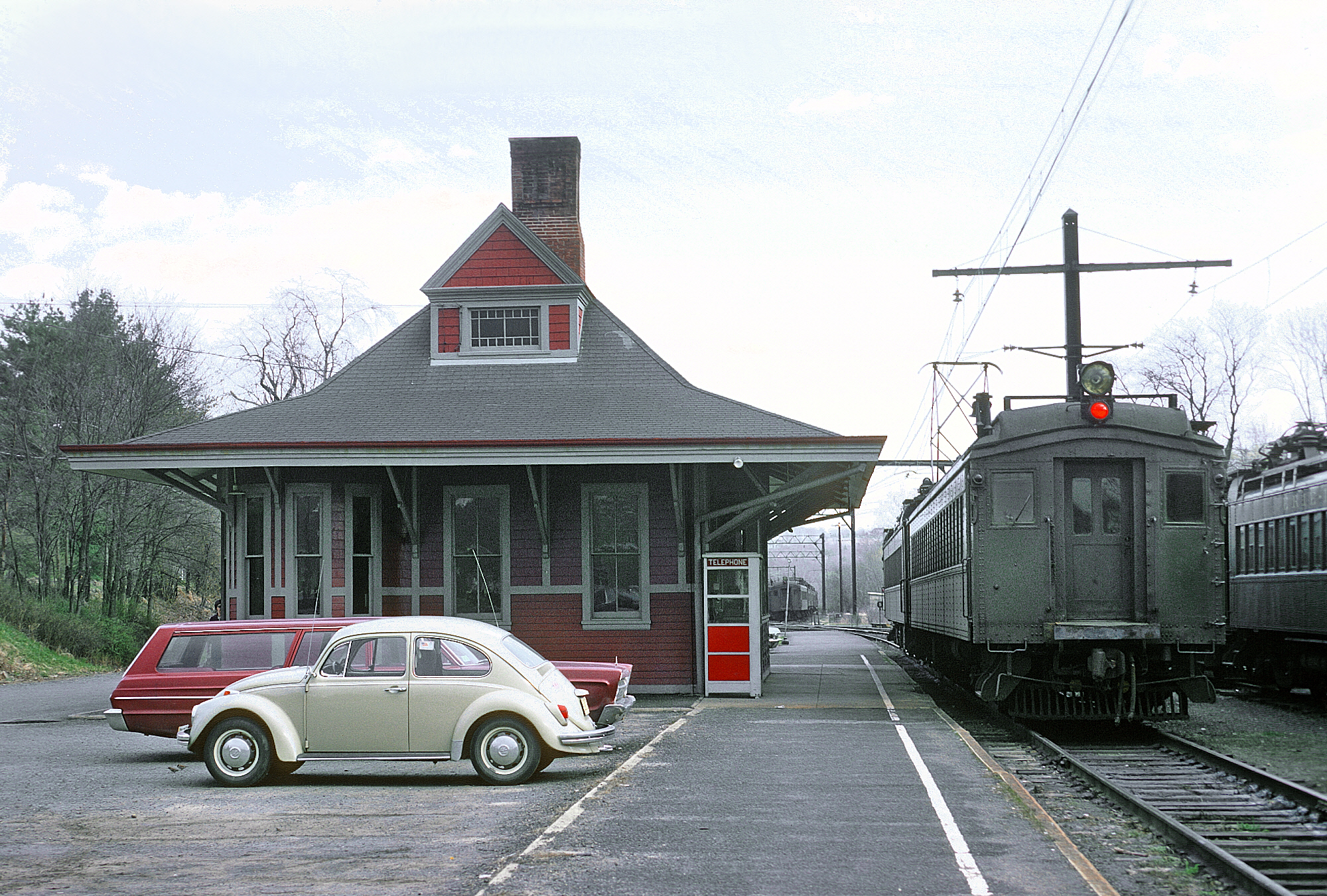
Gladstone Station c. 1970

=== Roads and highways ===
A few major roads pass through the community including U.S. Route 206 and County Route 512.

=== Public transportation ===
Gladstone is an NJ Transit station that is the western terminus of the Gladstone Branch of the Morris and Essex line. Out of 23 inbound and 26 outbound daily weekday trains, 2 inbound and 2 outbound trains (about 8%) use the Kearny Connection to Secaucus Junction and New York Penn Station in Midtown Manhattan; the rest go to Hoboken Terminal. Passengers can transfer at Newark Broad Street or Summit stations to reach the other destination if necessary.

The Gladstone train station building was re-labeled "Boston," and its surroundings were supplied with peat-moss dirt, period vehicles and extras in Victorian dress, for a 1962 movie shoot. In the Oscar-winning film The Miracle Worker, Anne Bancroft in the role of Annie Sullivan boards a long-distance steam train there to take the job as Helen Keller's teacher.

== Notable people ==
People who were born in, residents of, or otherwise closely associated with Gladstone include:

- Charles E. Apgar (1865–1950), business executive and amateur radio operator best known for making early recordings of coded German radio transmissions at the start of World War I.
- Jason Gore (born 1974), PGA Tour professional golfer who is the Senior Director of Player Relations for the United States Golf Association.
- Orin R. Smith, former chairman and CEO of Engelhard Corporation
