= Bedminster Township School District =

Public school district in Somerset County, New Jersey, US

Address
- 234 Somerville Road Bedminster, Somerset County, New Jersey, 07921; United States
- Coordinates: 40.679042°N 74.645383°W

District information
- Grades: Pre-K to 8
- Superintendent: Jennifer Giordano
- Business administrator: Robbin Boehmer
- Schools: 1

Students and staff
- Enrollment: 432 (as of 2023–24)
- Faculty: 49.8 FTEs
- Student–teacher ratio: 8.7:1

Other information
- District Factor Group: I
- Website: www.bedminsterschool.org
Ind.	Per pupil	District spending	Rank (*)	K-8 average	%± vs. average
1A	Total Spending	$20,329	51	$18,891	7.6%
1	Budgetary Cost	16,157	50	14,159	14.1%
2	Classroom Instruction	9,945	52	8,659	14.9%
6	Support Services	2,733	55	2,167	26.1%
8	Administrative Cost	1,612	27	1,547	4.2%
10	Operations & Maintenance	1,660	38	1,612	3.0%
13	Extracurricular Activities	174	45	104	67.3%
16	Median Teacher Salary	64,465	40	61,136
Data from NJDoE 2014 Taxpayers' Guide to Education Spending. *Of K-8 districts with 401-750 students. Lowest spending=1; Highest=64

The Bedminster Township School District is a community public school district that serves students in pre-kindergarten through eighth grade from Bedminster, in Somerset County, in the U.S. state of New Jersey.

As of the 2023–24 school year, the district, comprised of one school, had an enrollment of 432 students and 49.8 classroom teachers (on an FTE basis), for a student–teacher ratio of 8.7:1.

The district had been classified by the New Jersey Department of Education as being in District Factor Group "I", the second-highest of eight groupings. District Factor Groups organize districts statewide to allow comparison by common socioeconomic characteristics of the local districts. From lowest socioeconomic status to highest, the categories are A, B, CD, DE, FG, GH, I and J.

Public school students in ninth through twelfth grades attend Bernards High School, as part of a sending/receiving relationship with the Somerset Hills School District, a regional K - 12 district that also serves students from Bernardsville, Far Hills and Peapack-Gladstone. As of the 2023–24 school year, the high school had an enrollment of 796 students and 66.8 classroom teachers (on an FTE basis), for a student–teacher ratio of 11.9:1.

== School ==
Bedminster Township Public School had an enrollment of 483 students in grades PreK to 8 in the 2023–24 school year.

- Corby Swan, principal (PreK to 4th Grade)
- Lauren Zugale, principal (5th Grade to 8th Grade)

Bedminster Township Public School offers a variety of competitive sports.

== Administration ==
Core members of the district's administration are:

- Jennifer Giordano, superintendent
- Robbin Boehmer, business administrator and board secretary

== Board of education ==
The district's board of education is comprised of nine members who set policy and oversee the fiscal and educational operation of the district through its administration. As a Type II school district, the board's trustees are elected directly by voters to serve three-year terms of office on a staggered basis, with three seats up for election each year held (since 2012) as part of the November general election. The board appoints a superintendent to oversee the district's day-to-day operations and a business administrator to supervise the business functions of the district.
