= Montgomery Township School District =

School district Somerset County, New Jersey, US

Coordinates: 40.417516°N 74.702407°W

Address
- 1014 Route 601 Skillman, Somerset County, New Jersey, 08558; United States

District information
- Grades: PreK-12
- Superintendent: Mary E. McLoughlin
- Business administrator: Andrew Italiano
- Schools: 5

Students and staff
- Enrollment: 4,611 (as of 2022–23)
- Faculty: 403.6 FTEs
- Student–teacher ratio: 11.4:1

Other information
- District Factor Group: J
- Website: www.mtsd.k12.nj.us
Ind.	Per pupil	District spending	Rank (*)	K-12 average	%± vs. average
1A	Total Spending	$17,713	41	$18,891	−6.2%
1	Budgetary Cost	13,907	40	14,783	−5.9%
2	Classroom Instruction	8,186	28	8,763	−6.6%
6	Support Services	1,975	28	2,392	−17.4%
8	Administrative Cost	1,437	50	1,485	−3.2%
10	Operations & Maintenance	1,842	71	1,783	3.3%
13	Extracurricular Activities	338	88	268	26.1%
16	Median Teacher Salary	67,450	68	64,043
Data from NJDoE 2014 Taxpayers' Guide to Education Spending. *Of K-12 districts with more than 3,500 students. Lowest spending=1; Highest=103

The Montgomery Township School District is a comprehensive public school district, consisting of five school facilities, that serves students in pre-kindergarten through twelfth grade from Montgomery Township and Rocky Hill, in Somerset County, in the U.S. state of New Jersey. Montgomery Township had been one of the fastest-growing school districts in New Jersey. In September 1992, the K-12 enrollment was 1,590 compared to 4,924 in September 2005, tripling in just more than a decade.

As of the 2022–23 school year, the district, comprised of five schools, had an enrollment of 4,611 students and 403.6 classroom teachers (on an FTE basis), for a student–teacher ratio of 11.4:1.

The district is classified by the New Jersey Department of Education as being in District Factor Group "J", the highest of eight groupings. District Factor Groups organize districts statewide to allow comparison by common socioeconomic characteristics of the local districts.

== History ==
Rocky Hill was a non-operating school district whose school children had attended the Montgomery Township schools as part of a sending/receiving relationship, but has since been incorporated into the school district.

== Awards and recognition ==
For the 1992–93 school year, Montgomery High School was formally designated as a National Blue Ribbon School of Excellence. Montgomery Middle School was recognized as a Blue Ribbon School for the 1999–2000 school year. In 2024, Montgomery Upper Middle School was one of 11 statewide that was recognized as a Blue Ribbon School of Excellence by the United States Department of Education.

The Montgomery Township School District has been ranked among the best schools in New Jersey. Montgomery Township's schools were ranked as "the best bang for the buck" (New Jersey Monthly magazine), referring to the high achievement of students with a relatively low spending per pupil (compared to other school districts in New Jersey). Montgomery High School was the 4th ranked public high school in New Jersey out of 316 schools statewide, in New Jersey Monthly magazine's September 2006 cover story on the state's Top Public High Schools.

== Schools ==
Schools in the district (with 2022–23 enrollment data from the National Center for Education Statistics) are:

Elementary schools

- Orchard Hill Elementary School with 813 students in grades PreK-2
  - Daniel Van Hise, principal
- Village Elementary School with 628 students in grades 3–4
  - Susan Lacy, principal

Middle schools

- Montgomery Lower Middle School with 738 students in grades 5–6
  - Lisa Romano, principal
- Montgomery Upper Middle School with 790 students in grades 7–8
  - Mark Accardi, principal

High school

- Montgomery High School with 1,603 students in grades 9–12
  - Heather Pino-Beattie, principal

== Administration ==
Core members of the district's administration are:

- Mary E. McLoughlin, superintendent
- Andrew Italiano, business administrator and board secretary

== Board of education ==
The district's board of education, comprised of nine members, sets policy and oversees the fiscal and educational operation of the district through its administration. As a Type II school district, the board's trustees are elected directly by voters to serve three-year terms of office on a staggered basis, with three seats up for election each year held (since 2013) as part of the November general election. The board appoints a superintendent to oversee the district's day-to-day operations and a business administrator to supervise the business functions of the district.
