= Somerville Public Schools =

School district in Somerset County, New Jersey, US

Coordinates: 40.57202°N 74.613087°W

Address
- 51 West Cliff Street Somerville, Somerset County, New Jersey, 08876; United States

District information
- Grades: PreK-12
- Superintendent: Gary Lubisco Jr.
- Business administrator: Bryan P. Boyce
- Schools: 3

Students and staff
- Enrollment: 2,198 (as of 2021–22)
- Faculty: 212.5 FTEs
- Student–teacher ratio: 10.3:1

Other information
- District Factor Group: FG
- Website: www.somervilleschools.org
Ind.	Per pupil	District spending	Rank (*)	K-12 average	%± vs. average
1A	Total Spending	$18,176	36	$18,891	−3.8%
1	Budgetary Cost	13,709	34	14,783	−7.3%
2	Classroom Instruction	8,440	42	8,763	−3.7%
6	Support Services	1,840	17	2,392	−23.1%
8	Administrative Cost	1,556	40	1,485	4.8%
10	Operations & Maintenance	1,261	8	1,783	−29.3%
13	Extracurricular Activities	480	54	268	79.1%
16	Median Teacher Salary	63,308	35	64,043
Data from NJDoE 2014 Taxpayers' Guide to Education Spending. *Of K-12 districts with 1,800-3,500 students. Lowest spending=1; Highest=68

The Somerville Public Schools are a comprehensive community public school district that serves students in pre-kindergarten through twelfth grade from Somerville, in Somerset County, in the U.S. state of New Jersey.

As of the 2021–22 school year, the district, comprised of three schools, had an enrollment of 2,198 students and 212.5 classroom teachers (on an FTE basis), for a student–teacher ratio of 10.3:1.

The district is classified by the New Jersey Department of Education as being in District Factor Group "FG", the fourth-highest of eight groupings. District Factor Groups organize districts statewide to allow comparison by common socioeconomic characteristics of the local districts. From lowest socioeconomic status to highest, the categories are A, B, CD, DE, FG, GH, I and J.

Students from Branchburg Township attend the district's high school as part of a sending/receiving relationship with the Branchburg Township School District. For many years, Branchburg has accounted for 60-65% of the high school's enrollment.

== History ==
The sending / receiving relationship between Branchburg and Somerville was formalized in a 1956 agreement between the two districts, though Branchburg students had attended Somerville High School before that time. In 1970, the Somerville district determined that rising enrollments meant that it would no longer be able to include students from Branchburg and set 1975 as the end date for the sending relationship. Branchburg started the process of acquiring a 76-acre (31 ha) site for its own high school that could accommodate up to 950 students.

In May 1971, Somerville reconsidered its planned termination of the sending arrangement and informed Branchburg that its students would still be welcome in Somerville even after the planned 1975 date. Despite the failure of a referendum to pay for a new Branchburg high school, the Branchburg district decided that it wanted to terminate the relationship, even after Somerville had reconsidered its decision. Branchburg filed a petition in 1975 with the New Jersey Department of Education seeking to terminate the send/receive agreement.

Based on a report by the hearing examiner released in 1977, Commissioner of Education Fred G. Burke issued a 1978 decision that the petition be rejected based on the ability of Somerville to serve students from Branchburg with a quality high school education, the financial impact of higher per-pupil costs to both municipalities and the creation of greater racial imbalance in the Somerville district. The State Board of Education agreed with the commissioner's decision and Branchburg's appeal to the Superior Court of New Jersey, Appellate Division was rejected in a 1980 decision.

== Awards and recognition ==
Somerville Public Schools was voted one of the "100 Top Schools in Towns You Can Afford" in the January 1996 issue of Money magazine. Somerville High School was ranked as one of the "Top 75 Public High Schools" by New Jersey Monthly magazine in its September 1996 issue.

Somerville Public Schools was ranked 631st nationwide in The Daily Beast / Newsweek list of "America's Best High Schools 2012".

== Schools ==
Schools in the district (with 2021–22 enrollment data from the National Center for Education Statistics) are:

Elementary school

- Van Derveer Elementary School with 712 students in grades PreK-5
  - Robert Reavey, principal

Middle school

- Somerville Middle School with 314 students in grades 6-8
  - Scott Hade, principal

High school

- Somerville High School with 1,142 students in grades 9-12
  - Gerard T. Foley, principal

== Administration ==
Core members of the district's administration are:

- Gary Lubisco, Jr. superintendent
- Bryan P. Boyce, business administrator and board secretary

== Board of education ==
The district's board of education, comprised of nine members, sets policy and oversees the fiscal and educational operation of the district through its administration. As a Type II school district, the board's trustees are elected directly by voters to serve three-year terms of office on a staggered basis, with three seats up for election each year held (since 2012) as part of the November general election. The board appoints a superintendent to oversee the district's day-to-day operations and a business administrator to supervise the business functions of the district. A tenth representative is chosen by the Branchburg district to represent its interest on the Somerville board.
