= South Bound Brook School District =

School district in Somerset County, New Jersey, US

Address
- 122 Elizabeth Street South Bound Brook, Somerset County, New Jersey, 08880; United States
- Coordinates: 40.553908°N 74.531022°W

District information
- Grades: pre-K to 8
- Superintendent: Lorise Goeke
- Business administrator: Eulalia Gillis (interim)
- Schools: 1

Students and staff
- Enrollment: 431 (as of 2022–23)
- Faculty: 39.6 FTEs
- Student–teacher ratio: 10.9:1

Other information
- District Factor Group: B
- Website: www.southboundbrookk8.org
Ind.	Per pupil	District spending	Rank (*)	K-8 average	%± vs. average
1A	Total Spending	$16,790	18	$18,891	−11.1%
1	Budgetary Cost	14,819	39	14,159	4.7%
2	Classroom Instruction	8,378	28	8,659	−3.2%
6	Support Services	2,599	49	2,167	19.9%
8	Administrative Cost	1,500	18	1,547	−3.0%
10	Operations & Maintenance	1,516	28	1,612	−6.0%
13	Extracurricular Activities	72	17	104	−30.8%
16	Median Teacher Salary	69,128	57	61,136
Data from NJDoE 2014 Taxpayers' Guide to Education Spending. *Of K-8 districts with 401-750 students. Lowest spending=1; Highest=64

The South Bound Brook School District is a community public school district that serves public school students in pre-kindergarten through eighth grade from South Bound Brook, in Somerset County, in the U.S. state of New Jersey.

As of the 2022–23 school year, the district, comprised of one school, had an enrollment of 431 students and 39.6 classroom teachers (on an FTE basis), for a student–teacher ratio of 10.9:1.

The district had been classified by the New Jersey Department of Education as being in District Factor Group "B", the second lowest of eight groupings. District Factor Groups organize districts statewide to allow comparison by common socioeconomic characteristics of the local districts. From lowest socioeconomic status to highest, the categories are A, B, CD, DE, FG, GH, I and J.

For ninth through twelfth grades, public school students attend Bound Brook High School in Bound Brook as part of a sending/receiving relationship with the Bound Brook School District. As of the 2020–21 school year, the high school had an enrollment of 652 students and 48.5 classroom teachers (on an FTE basis), for a student–teacher ratio of 13.4:1.

== Schools ==
Robert Morris School had an enrollment of 428 students in grades pre-K-8 as of the 2020–21 school year.

== Administration ==
Core members of the district's administration are:

- Lorise Goeke, superintendent and principal
- Eulalia Gillis, interim business administrator and board secretary

== Board of education ==
The district's board of education, comprised of seven members, sets policy and oversees the fiscal and educational operation of the district through its administration. As a Type II school district, the board's trustees are elected directly by voters to serve three-year terms of office on a staggered basis, with either two or three seats up for election each year held (since 2012) as part of the November general election. The board appoints a superintendent to oversee the district's day-to-day operations and a business administrator to supervise the business functions of the district.
