= Warren Township Schools =

School district in Somerset County, New Jersey, US

Address
- 213 Mt. Horeb Road Warren Township, Somerset County, New Jersey, 07059; United States
- Coordinates: 40.626413°N 74.501258°W

District information
- Grades: PreK-8
- Superintendent: Matthew Mingle
- Business administrator: Christopher Heagele
- Schools: 5

Students and staff
- Enrollment: 1,525 (as of 2020–21)
- Faculty: 188.3 FTEs
- Student–teacher ratio: 8.1:1

Other information
- District Factor Group: I
- Website: www.warrentboe.org
Ind.	Per pupil	District spending	Rank (*)	K-8 average	%± vs. average
1A	Total Spending	$22,372	82	$18,891	18.4%
1	Budgetary Cost	18,074	82	14,159	27.7%
2	Classroom Instruction	11,275	82	8,659	30.2%
6	Support Services	3,027	78	2,167	39.7%
8	Administrative Cost	1,538	41	1,547	−0.6%
10	Operations & Maintenance	2,043	79	1,612	26.7%
13	Extracurricular Activities	90	41	104	−13.5%
16	Median Teacher Salary	68,767	76	61,136
Data from NJDoE 2014 Taxpayers' Guide to Education Spending. *Of K-8 districts with more than 750 students. Lowest spending=1; Highest=84

The Warren Township Schools are a community public school district that serves students in pre-kindergarten through eighth grade from Warren Township, in Somerset County, in the U.S. state of New Jersey.

As of the 2020–21 school year, the district, comprised of five schools, had an enrollment of 1,525 students and 188.3 classroom teachers (on an FTE basis), for a student–teacher ratio of 8.1:1.

The district is classified by the New Jersey Department of Education as being in District Factor Group "I", the second-highest of eight groupings. District Factor Groups organize districts statewide to allow comparison by common socioeconomic characteristics of the local districts. From lowest socioeconomic status to highest, the categories are A, B, CD, DE, FG, GH, I and J.

Students in public school for ninth through twelfth grades attend Watchung Hills Regional High School on Stirling Road next to Woodland School. The school also serves students from Warren as well as the neighboring communities of Watchung, Green Brook (in Somerset County and through sending/receiving relationship), and Long Hill Township (in Morris County). As of the 2020–21 school year, the high school had an enrollment of 1,909 students and 157.6 classroom teachers (on an FTE basis), for a student–teacher ratio of 12.1:1.

== Awards and recognition ==
Woodland School was one of nine public schools recognized in 2017 as Blue Ribbon Schools by the United States Department of Education.

== Schools ==
Schools in the district (with 2020–21 enrollment data from the National Center for Education Statistics.) are:

Elementary schools

- Central School with 293 students in grades K-5
  - Alison Tugya, principal
- Mt. Horeb School with 202 students in grades PreK-5
  - Scott Cook, principal
- Angelo L. Tomaso School with 248 students in grades K-5
  - Christine Smith, principal
- Woodland School with 229 students in grades K-5
  - Jeff Heaney, principal

Middle school

- Warren Middle School with 544 students in grades 6-8
  - George Villar, principal

== Administration ==
Core members of the district's administration are:

- Matthew Mingle, superintendent
- Christopher Heagele, business administrator and board secretary

== Board of education ==
The district's board of education is comprised of nine members who set policy and oversee the fiscal and educational operation of the district through its administration. As a Type II school district, the board's trustees are elected directly by voters to serve three-year terms of office on a staggered basis, with three seats up for election each year held (since 2012) as part of the November general election. The board appoints a superintendent to oversee the district's day-to-day operations and a business administrator to supervise the business functions of the district.
