= Branchburg Township School District =

School district in Somerset County, New Jersey, US

Address
- 240 Baird Road Branchburg, Somerset County, New Jersey, 08876; United States
- Coordinates: 40.573516°N 74.714605°W

District information
- Grades: PreK to 8
- Superintendent: Kevin McPeek
- Business administrator: Stephanie Voorhees
- Schools: 3

Students and staff
- Enrollment: 1,396 (as of 2024–25)
- Faculty: 163.0 FTEs
- Student–teacher ratio: 8.6:1

Other information
- District Factor Group: I
- Website: www.branchburg.k12.nj.us
Ind.	Per pupil	District spending	Rank (*)	K-8 average	%± vs. average
1A	Total Spending	$17,974	56	$18,891	−4.9%
1	Budgetary Cost	14,924	61	14,159	5.4%
2	Classroom Instruction	9,155	63	8,659	5.7%
6	Support Services	2,377	59	2,167	9.7%
8	Administrative Cost	1,747	66	1,547	12.9%
10	Operations & Maintenance	1,330	22	1,612	−17.5%
13	Extracurricular Activities	123	68	104	18.3%
16	Median Teacher Salary	60,685	38	61,136
Data from NJDoE 2014 Taxpayers' Guide to Education Spending. *Of K-8 districts with more than 750 students. Lowest spending=1; Highest=84

The Branchburg Township School District is a community public school district serving students in pre-kindergarten through eighth grade from Branchburg, in Somerset County, in the U.S. state of New Jersey.

As of the 2024–25 school year, the district, comprised of three schools, had an enrollment of 1,396 students and 163.0 classroom teachers (on an FTE basis), for a student–teacher ratio of 8.6:1.

The public secondary school serving Branchburg for ninth through twelfth grades is Somerville High School, which students attend as part of a sending/receiving relationship with the Somerville Public Schools. As of the 2024–25 school year, the high school had an enrollment of 1,072 students and 94.0 classroom teachers (on an FTE basis), for a student–teacher ratio of 11.4:1.

== History ==
The sending / receiving relationship between Branchburg and Somerville was formalized in a 1956 agreement between the two districts, though Branchburg students had attended Somerville High School before that time. In 1970, the Somerville district determined that rising enrollments meant that it would no longer be able to include students from Branchburg and set 1975 as the end date for the sending relationship. Branchburg started the process of acquiring a 76-acre (31 ha) site for its own high school that could accommodate up to 950 students.

In May 1971, Somerville reconsidered its planned termination of the sending arrangement and informed Branchburg that its students would still be welcome in Somerville even after the planned 1975 date. Despite the failure of a referendum to pay for a new Branchburg high school, the Branchburg district decided that it wanted to terminate the relationship, even after Somerville had reconsidered its decision. Branchburg filed a petition in 1975 with the New Jersey Department of Education seeking to terminate the send/receive agreement.

Based on a report by the hearing examiner released in 1977, Commissioner of Education Fred G. Burke issued a 1978 decision that the petition be rejected based on the ability of Somerville to serve students from Branchburg with a quality high school education, the financial impact of higher per-pupil costs to both municipalities and the creation of greater racial imbalance in the Somerville district. The State Board of Education agreed with the commissioner's decision and Branchburg's appeal to the Superior Court of New Jersey, Appellate Division was rejected in a 1980 decision.

The district had been classified by the New Jersey Department of Education as being in District Factor Group "I", the second-highest of eight groupings. District Factor Groups organize districts statewide to allow comparison by common socioeconomic characteristics of the local districts. From lowest socioeconomic status to highest, the categories are A, B, CD, DE, FG, GH, I and J.

== Schools ==
Schools in the district (with 2024–25 enrollment data from the National Center for Education Statistics) are:

Elementary schools

- Whiton Elementary School with 617 students in grades PreK–3
  - Dee Shober, principal
- Stony Brook School with 310 students in grades 4–5
  - Kristen Kries, principal

Middle school

- Branchburg Central Middle School with 458 students in grades 6–8
  - Beth Stanton, principal

== Administration ==
Core district administration members are:

- Kevin McPeek, superintendent of schools
- Stephanie Voorhees, interim business administrator and board secretary

== Board of education ==
The district's board of education is comprised of nine members who set policy and oversee the fiscal and educational operation of the district through its administration. As a Type II school district, the board's trustees are elected directly by voters to serve three-year terms of office on a staggered basis, with three seats up for election each year held (since 2012) as part of the November general election. The board appoints a superintendent to oversee the district's day-to-day operations and a business administrator to supervise the business functions of the district.
