= Bound Brook School District =

School district in Somerset County, New Jersey, US

Address
- 111 West Union Avenue Bound Brook, Somerset County, New Jersey, 08805
- Coordinates: 40.563575°N 74.539009°W

District information
- Grades: PreK to 12
- Superintendent: Alvin Freeman
- Business administrator: Vacant
- Schools: 5

Students and staff
- Enrollment: 1,975 (as of 2020–21)
- Faculty: 172.0 FTEs
- Student–teacher ratio: 11.5:1

Other information
- District Factor Group: B
- Website: www.bbrook.org
| Ind. | Per pupil | District spending | Rank (*) | K-12 average | %± vs. average |
|---|---|---|---|---|---|
| 1A | Total Spending | $15,380 | 5 | $18,891 | −18.6% |
| 1 | Budgetary Cost | 13,443 | 20 | 14,783 | −9.1% |
| 2 | Classroom Instruction | 7,308 | 10 | 8,763 | −16.6% |
| 6 | Support Services | 1,744 | 10 | 2,392 | −27.1% |
| 8 | Administrative Cost | 1,692 | 26 | 1,485 | 13.9% |
| 10 | Operations & Maintenance | 2,314 | 49 | 1,783 | 29.8% |
| 13 | Extracurricular Activities | 351 | 10 | 268 | 31.0% |
| 16 | Median Teacher Salary | 58,720 | 23 | 64,043 |
Data from NJDoE 2014 Taxpayers' Guide to Education Spending. *Of K-12 districts with up to 1,800 students. Lowest spending=1; Highest=49

The Bound Brook School District is a comprehensive community public school district that serves students in pre-Kindergarten through twelfth grade from Bound Brook, in Somerset County, in the U.S. state of New Jersey.

As of the 2020–21 school year, the district, comprised of five schools, had an enrollment of 1,975 students and 172.0 classroom teachers (on an FTE basis), for a student–teacher ratio of 11.5:1.

The district participates in the Interdistrict Public School Choice Program, which allows non-resident students to attend school in the district at no cost to their parents, with tuition covered by the resident district. Available slots are announced annually by grade.

The district had been classified by the New Jersey Department of Education as being in District Factor Group "B", the second-lowest of eight groupings. District Factor Groups organize districts statewide to allow comparison by common socioeconomic characteristics of the local districts. From lowest socioeconomic status to highest, the categories are A, B, CD, DE, FG, GH, I and J.

Students from South Bound Brook, New Jersey, attend the district's high school as part of a sending/receiving relationship with the South Bound Brook School District. At the beginning of the 2011–12 school year, the district joined the Interdistrict Public School Choice Program, which allows students from other area communities to attend the Bound Brook schools.

== Schools ==
Schools in the district (with 2020–21 enrollment data from the National Center for Education Statistics) are:

Elementary schools

- LaMonte-Annex Elementary School with 195 students in grades PreK-Kindergarten
  - Hipolita Hernandez-Sicignano, principal
- Lafayette Elementary School with 266 students in grades 1-2
  - Erika Clarke, principal
- Smalley Elementary School with 545 students in grades 3-6
  - Nicholas Edwards, principal

Middle school

- Community Middle School with 283 students in grades 7-8
  - Joseph Santicerma, principal

High school

- Bound Brook High School with 652 students in grades 9-12
  - Edward Smith, principal

== Administration ==
Core members of the district's administration are:

- Alvin Freeman, superintendent
- Vacant, business administrator and board secretary

== Board of education ==
The district's board of education is comprised of nine members who set policy and oversee the fiscal and educational operation of the district through its administration. As a Type II school district, the board's trustees are elected directly by voters to serve three-year terms of office on a staggered basis, with three seats up for election each year held (since 2012) as part of the November general election. A tenth, appointed member, represents the interests of the South Bound Brook district. The board appoints a superintendent to oversee the district's day-to-day operations and a business administrator to supervise the business functions of the district.
