= Cory's Brook =

River in the United States of America

Coordinates: 40°39′12″N 74°30′06″W

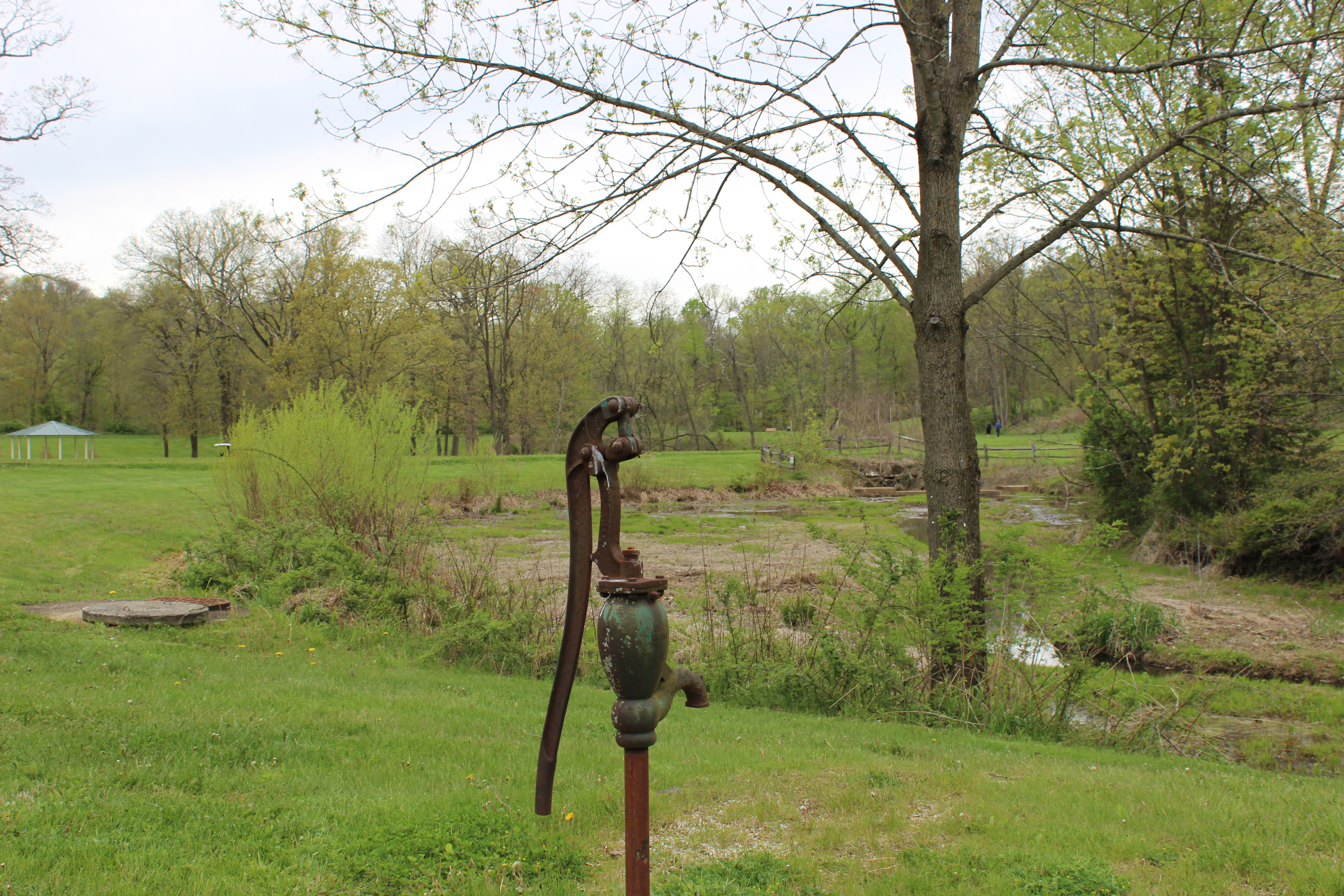
Pond in East County Park, Somerset County, NJ

Cory's Brook is a tributary of the Passaic River that has its source in Warren, New Jersey. The brook forms a pond at the East County Park in Warren Township.

== See also ==
- List of New Jersey rivers
