= East County Park (New Jersey) =

Park in New Jersey, United States

Coordinates: 40.636°N 74.493°W

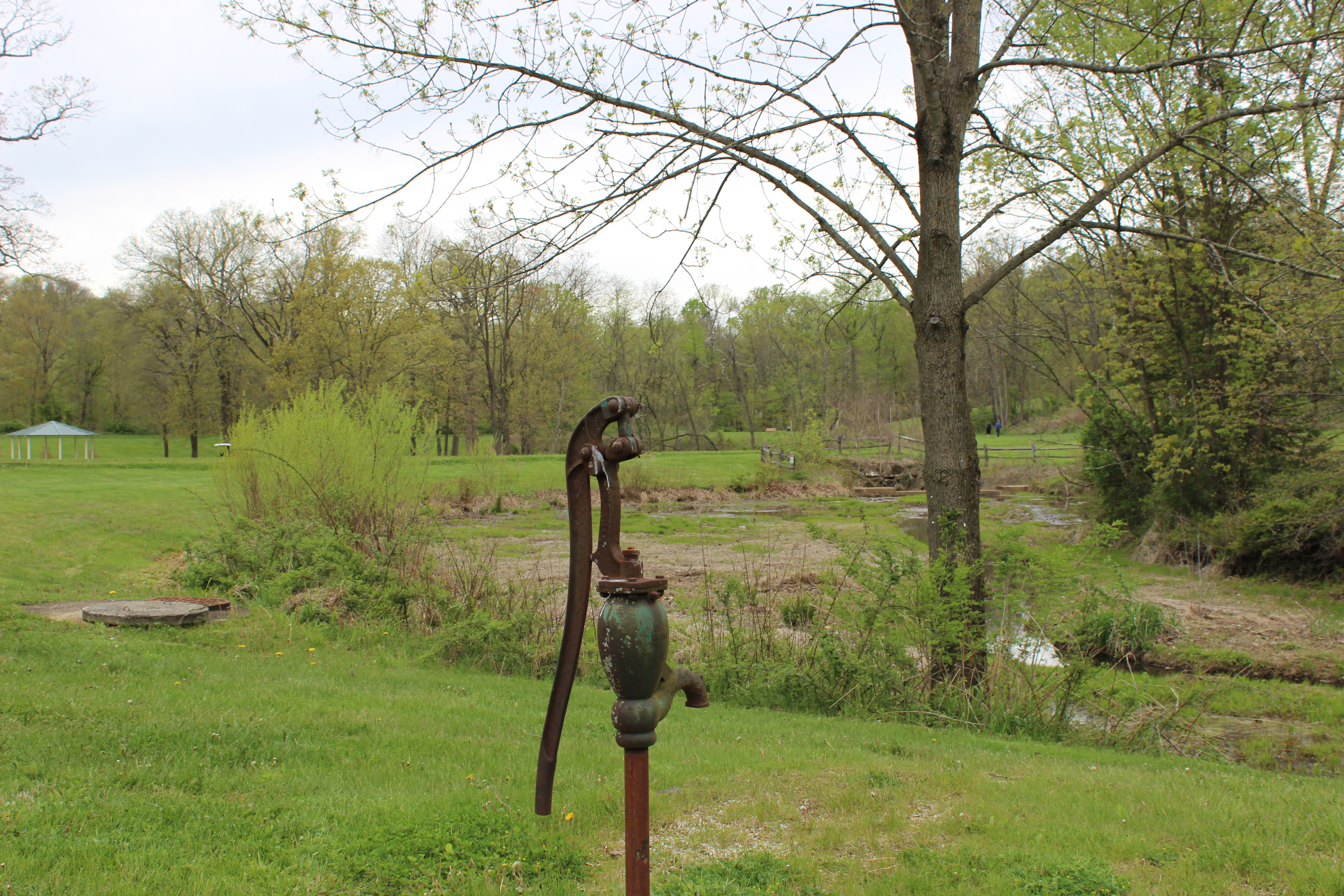
East County Park, May 2020

East County Park is a public park in Warren, Somerset County, New Jersey. It is operated by the Somerset County Park Commission.

The park was created after the County bought four parcels of farmland between 1997 and 2001. It contains 150 acres with woods and meadows. At the center is a half-mile trail covered with stone looping around a pond. Cory's Brook flows through the park and is a tributary of the Passaic River. Side trails branch off the loop. The park has a leash-free dog area. An asphalted trail links the loop to the athletic fields with a bathroom facility.
