= Somerset County, New Jersey =

County in New Jersey, United States

- County
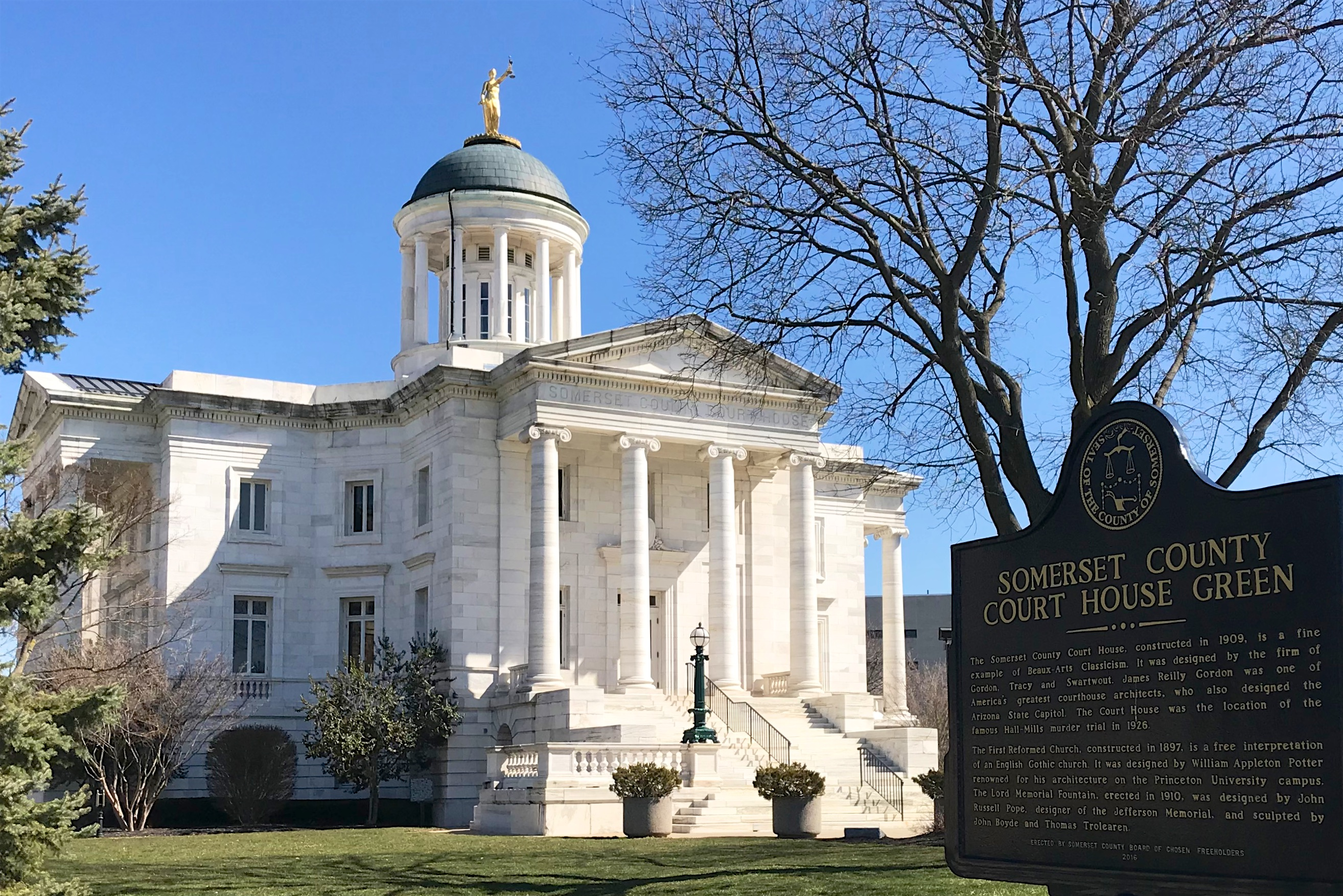
- Somerset County courthouse in Somerville, the county seat

- Flag Seal

- Location within the U.S. state of New Jersey
- Interactive map of Somerset County, New Jersey
- Coordinates: 40.56°N 74.61°W
- Country: United States
- State: New Jersey
- Founded: May 14, 1688
- Named for: English county of Somerset
- Seat: Somerville
- Largest municipality: Franklin Township (population); Hillsborough Township (area)

Government
  - Commissioner director: Shanel Robinson (D, term ends December 31, 2026)

Area
  - Total: 304.95 sq mi (789.8 km^{2})
  - Land: 301.87 sq mi (781.8 km^{2})
  - Water: 3.09 sq mi (8.0 km^{2}) 1.00%

Population (2020)
  - Total: 345,361 ▲
  - Estimate (2025): 356,486
  - Density: 1,144.1/sq mi (441.73/km^{2})
- Time zone: UTC−5 (Eastern)
  - Summer (DST): UTC−4 (EDT)
- Congressional districts: 7th, 12th
- Website: www.somersetcountynj.gov

Somerset County is a county located in the north-central part of the U.S. state of New Jersey. As of the 2020 census, the county was the state's 13th-most-populous county, with a population of 345,361, its highest decennial count ever and an increase of 21,917 (+6.8%) from the 2010 census count of 323,444. The United States Census Bureau's Population Estimates Program estimated a 2025 population of 356,486, an increase of 11,125 (+3.2%) from the 2020 decennial census. Somerset County constitutes part of the New York metropolitan area. Its county seat is Somerville. The most populous place in the county was Franklin Township, with 68,364 residents at the time of the 2020 census, while Hillsborough Township, with 55.00 square miles (142.4 km^{2}), covered the largest total area of any municipality. The county is part of the Central Jersey region of the state.

In 2015, Somerset County had a per capita personal income of $86,468, the second highest in New Jersey and ranked 25th of 3,113 counties in the United States. Somerset County, as of the 2000 Census, was the seventh wealthiest county in the United States by median household income at $76,933 (third in New Jersey behind Hunterdon County at $79,888 and Morris County at $77,340), fourth in median family income at $90,655 (second in New Jersey behind Hunterdon County at $91,050) and ranked seventh by per capita income at $37,970 (highest in New Jersey). The Bureau of Economic Analysis ranked the county as having the 11th-highest per capita income of all 3,113 counties in the United States (and the highest in New Jersey) as of 2009. As of 2023, Somerset County had the highest GDP for counties with populations between 100,000 and 500,000 in America.

In 2012, 49.8% of Somerset County residents were college graduates, the highest percentage in the state. Somerset County was recently ranked number three of 21 NJ counties as one of the healthiest counties in New Jersey, according to an annual report by County Health Rankings and Roadmaps. Somerset County was created on May 14, 1688, from portions of Middlesex County.

== History ==
=== Etymology ===
Somerset County is one of the oldest counties in the United States, and is named after the English county of Somerset.

=== History ===
The area was first settled in 1681 in the vicinity of Bound Brook, and the county was established by charter on May 22, 1688. Most of the early residents were Dutch.

During the American Revolutionary War, General George Washington and his troops marched through the county on several occasions and slept in many of the homes located throughout the area. Somerset County also played an important part during both World War I and World War II. Weapons depots were established here, and factories manufactured the army's woolen blankets. For much of its history, Somerset County was primarily an agricultural county. In the late 19th century, the Somerset Hills area of Somerset County became a popular area for country homes built by wealthy industrialists. The area continues to be the home of wealthy people who own businesses.

In 1917, Somerset County, in cooperation with Rutgers University, hired its first agricultural agent to connect local farmers with expert advice. The Rutgers Cooperative Extension of Somerset County, located in Bridgewater, serves residents in the areas of agriculture and natural resources, 4-H youth development, and family and community health sciences. In the 1960s, townships which were once exclusively agricultural were quickly developed as suburban residential communities. Examples include Bridgewater Township and the Watchung Hills communities of Watchung, Green Brook Township and Warren Township. The growth was aided by the development of the county's very strong pharmaceutical and technology presence. Warren Township used to be considered "the greenest place in New Jersey." More recently, an influx has occurred of New York City commuters who use NJ Transit's Raritan Valley Line and Gladstone Branch or use Interstate 78.

In 1996, Nicholas L. Bissell Jr., the county prosecutor, was charged with embezzlement, tax fraud, and abuse of power. He fled to Laughlin, Nevada, southeast of Las Vegas, and killed himself when the federal authorities attempted to arrest him.

== Geography ==
Somerville, New Jersey

Climate chart (precipitation, max. and min. temperature)
| J | F | M | A | M | J | J | A | S | O | N | D |
| 3.6 38 18 | 2.8 41 20 | 3.9 50 27 | 4.1 61 36 | 4.3 72 46 | 4.4 80 56 | 4.8 85 61 | 4 83 60 | 4.3 76 52 | 4.2 64 40 | 3.6 54 31 | 3.8 42 23 |
- █ Average max. and min. temperatures in °F
- █ Precipitation totals in inches
- Source: The Weather Channel
Metric conversion
| J | F | M | A | M | J | J | A | S | O | N | D |
| 91 3 −8 | 72 5 −7 | 100 10 −3 | 104 16 2 | 110 22 8 | 110 27 13 | 123 29 16 | 101 28 16 | 108 24 11 | 107 18 4 | 91 12 −1 | 98 6 −5 |
- █ Average max. and min. temperatures in °C
- █ Precipitation totals in mm

According to the U.S. Census Bureau, as of the 2020 Census, the county had a total area of 304.95 square miles (789.8 km^{2}), of which 3.09 sq mi (8.0 km^{2}) were covered by water.

The highest point in the county is on Mine Mountain in Bernardsville, around 860 feet (260 m) above mean sea level. The lowest point is just above sea level on the Raritan River at the Middlesex County line.

=== Climate and weather ===
In recent years, average temperatures in the county seat of Somerville have ranged from a low of 18 °F (−8 °C) in January to a high of 85 °F (29 °C) in July, although a record low of −16 °F (−27 °C) was recorded in January 1984 and a record high of 105 °F (41 °C) was recorded in August 1955. Average monthly precipitation ranged from 2.84 inches (72 mm) in February to 4.83 inches (123 mm) in July.

The county has a hot-summer humid continental climate (Dfa) except in lower areas along the Raritan River from Bound Brook downstream, where the climate is now humid subtropical (Cfa). The hardiness zone is 7a except in a few small, higher-elevation areas in the north, which are 6b.

== Demographics ==
Historical population
| Census | Pop. | Note | %± |
|---|---|---|---|
| 1790 | 12,296 | | — |
| 1800 | 12,815 | | 4.2% |
| 1810 | 14,725 | | 14.9% |
| 1820 | 16,506 | | 12.1% |
| 1830 | 17,689 | | 7.2% |
| 1840 | 17,455 | * | −1.3% |
| 1850 | 19,692 | | 12.8% |
| 1860 | 22,057 | | 12.0% |
| 1870 | 23,510 | | 6.6% |
| 1880 | 27,162 | | 15.5% |
| 1890 | 28,311 | | 4.2% |
| 1900 | 32,948 | | 16.4% |
| 1910 | 38,820 | | 17.8% |
| 1920 | 47,991 | | 23.6% |
| 1930 | 65,132 | | 35.7% |
| 1940 | 74,390 | | 14.2% |
| 1950 | 99,052 | | 33.2% |
| 1960 | 143,913 | | 45.3% |
| 1970 | 198,372 | | 37.8% |
| 1980 | 203,129 | | 2.4% |
| 1990 | 240,279 | | 18.3% |
| 2000 | 297,490 | | 23.8% |
| 2010 | 323,444 | | 8.7% |
| 2020 | 345,361 | | 6.8% |
| 2025 (est.) | 356,486 | | 3.2% |
Historical sources: 1790–1990; 1970-2010 2010 2020 * = Lost territory in previous decade.

=== 2020 census ===
As of the 2020 census, the county had a population of 345,361. The median age was 42.0 years. 21.5% of residents were under the age of 18 and 16.2% of residents were 65 years of age or older. For every 100 females there were 94.7 males, and for every 100 females age 18 and over there were 91.9 males age 18 and over.

The racial makeup of the county was 53.7% White, 9.2% Black or African American, 0.4% American Indian and Alaska Native, 19.5% Asian, <0.1% Native Hawaiian and Pacific Islander, 8.1% from some other race, and 9.0% from two or more races. Hispanic or Latino residents of any race comprised 16.6% of the population.

92.5% of residents lived in urban areas, while 7.5% lived in rural areas.

There were 125,598 households in the county, of which 34.0% had children under the age of 18 living in them. Of all households, 57.3% were married-couple households, 14.0% were households with a male householder and no spouse or partner present, and 23.8% were households with a female householder and no spouse or partner present. About 22.5% of all households were made up of individuals and 9.9% had someone living alone who was 65 years of age or older.

There were 131,822 housing units, of which 4.7% were vacant. Among occupied housing units, 72.3% were owner-occupied and 27.7% were renter-occupied. The homeowner vacancy rate was 1.2% and the rental vacancy rate was 5.9%.

The population density was 1,144.3 inhabitants per square mile (441.8/km^{2}). The 131,822 housing units had an average density of 436.77 per square mile (168.6/km^{2}).

=== Racial and ethnic composition ===
Somerset County, New Jersey – racial and ethnic composition Note: the US Census treats Hispanic/Latino as an ethnic category. This table excludes Latinos from the racial categories and assigns them to a separate category. Hispanics/Latinos may be of any race.
| Race / ethnicity (NH = Non-Hispanic) | Pop 1980 | Pop 1990 | Pop 2000 | Pop 2010 | Pop 2020 | % 1980 | % 1990 | % 2000 | % 2010 | % 2020 |
|---|---|---|---|---|---|---|---|---|---|---|
| White alone (NH) | 185,440 | 204,834 | 220,584 | 201,849 | 177,411 | 91.29% | 85.25% | 74.15% | 62.41% | 51.37% |
| Black or African American alone (NH) | 10,000 | 14,403 | 21,571 | 27,480 | 30,480 | 4.92% | 5.99% | 7.25% | 8.50% | 8.83% |
| Native American or Alaska Native alone (NH) | 151 | 227 | 229 | 285 | 306 | 0.07% | 0.09% | 0.08% | 0.09% | 0.09% |
| Asian alone (NH) | 2,817 | 10,394 | 24,870 | 45,473 | 67,098 | 1.39% | 4.33% | 8.36% | 14.06% | 19.43% |
| Native Hawaiian or Pacific Islander alone (NH) | x | x | 91 | 72 | 69 | x | x | 0.03% | 0.02% | 0.02% |
| Other race alone (NH) | 641 | 234 | 565 | 786 | 2,015 | 0.32% | 0.10% | 0.19% | 0.24% | 0.58% |
| Mixed-race or multiracial (NH) | x | x | 3,769 | 5,408 | 10,603 | x | x | 1.27% | 1.67% | 3.07% |
| Hispanic or Latino (any race) | 4,080 | 10,187 | 25,811 | 42,091 | 57,379 | 2.01% | 4.24% | 8.68% | 13.01% | 16.61% |
| Total | 203,129 | 240,279 | 297,490 | 323,444 | 345,361 | 100.00% | 100.00% | 100.00% | 100.00% | 100.00% |

=== American Community Survey ===
According to the 2019 American Community Survey 1-year estimates, there were 122,606 households, 88,540 families, and 21.5% of households had children under the age of 18 living with them; 59.3% were married couples living together; 9.6% had a female householder with no husband present; 3.3% had a male householder with no wife present; and 27.8% were not families. About 9.3% of households had someone living alone who was 65 years of age or older. The average household size was 2.65 and the average family size was 3.16.

The 2019 American Community Survey 1-year estimates also reported that the county's age distribution was 21.5% under age 18, 8.4% from age 18 to 24, 36.3% from age 25 to 44, 17.6% from age 45 to 64, and 16.2% age 65 or older. The median age was 42.2 years, and the gender makeup was 49.2% male and 50.8% female, with 96.8 males for every 100 females.

The 2019 American Community Survey 1-year estimates found that the median income for a household was $111,587, and for a family was $135,129. About 5.7% of the population were below the poverty line, including 8.8% of those under 18 and 6.1% of those 65 or over.

=== 2010 census ===
The 2010 United States census counted 323,444 people, 117,759 households, and 84,669 families in the county. The population density was 1,071.7 per square mile (413.8/km^{2}). There were 123,127 housing units at an average density of 408 per square mile (158/km^{2}). The racial makeup was 70.06% (226,608) White, 8.95% (28,943) Black or African American, 0.17% (556) Native American, 14.11% (45,650) Asian, 0.03% (94) Pacific Islander, 4.13% (13,360) from other races, and 2.55% (8,233) from two or more races. Hispanic or Latino people of any race were 13.01% (42,091) of the population.

Of the 117,759 households, 35.9% had children under 18; 58.8% were married couples living together; 9.5% had a female householder with no husband present and 28.1% were not families. Of all households, 23.3% were made up of individuals and 8.5% had someone living alone who was 65 or older. The average household size was 2.71 and the average family size was 3.22.

The county's age distribution was 25.0% under 18, 6.5% from 18 to 24, 26.4% from 25 to 44, 29.8% from 45 to 64, and 12.4% who were 65 or older. The median age was 40.2 years. For every 100 females, the population had 95.1 males. For every 100 females 18 and older, there were 91.8 males.

== Economy ==
The Bureau of Economic Analysis calculated that the county's gross domestic product was $39.8 billion in 2021, which was ranked sixth in the state and was a 5.6% increase from the prior year.

Based on IRS data for the 2004 tax year, Somerset County taxpayers had the ninth-highest average federal income tax liability per return in the country. Average tax liability was $16,502, representing 16.8% of adjusted gross income.

== Parks and recreation ==
The Somerset Patriots professional baseball team plays at the 6,100-seat TD Bank Ballpark, located on the border of Bridgewater and Bound Brook. The team played in the independent Atlantic League of Professional Baseball until they became the Double-A affiliate of the New York Yankees in 2021.

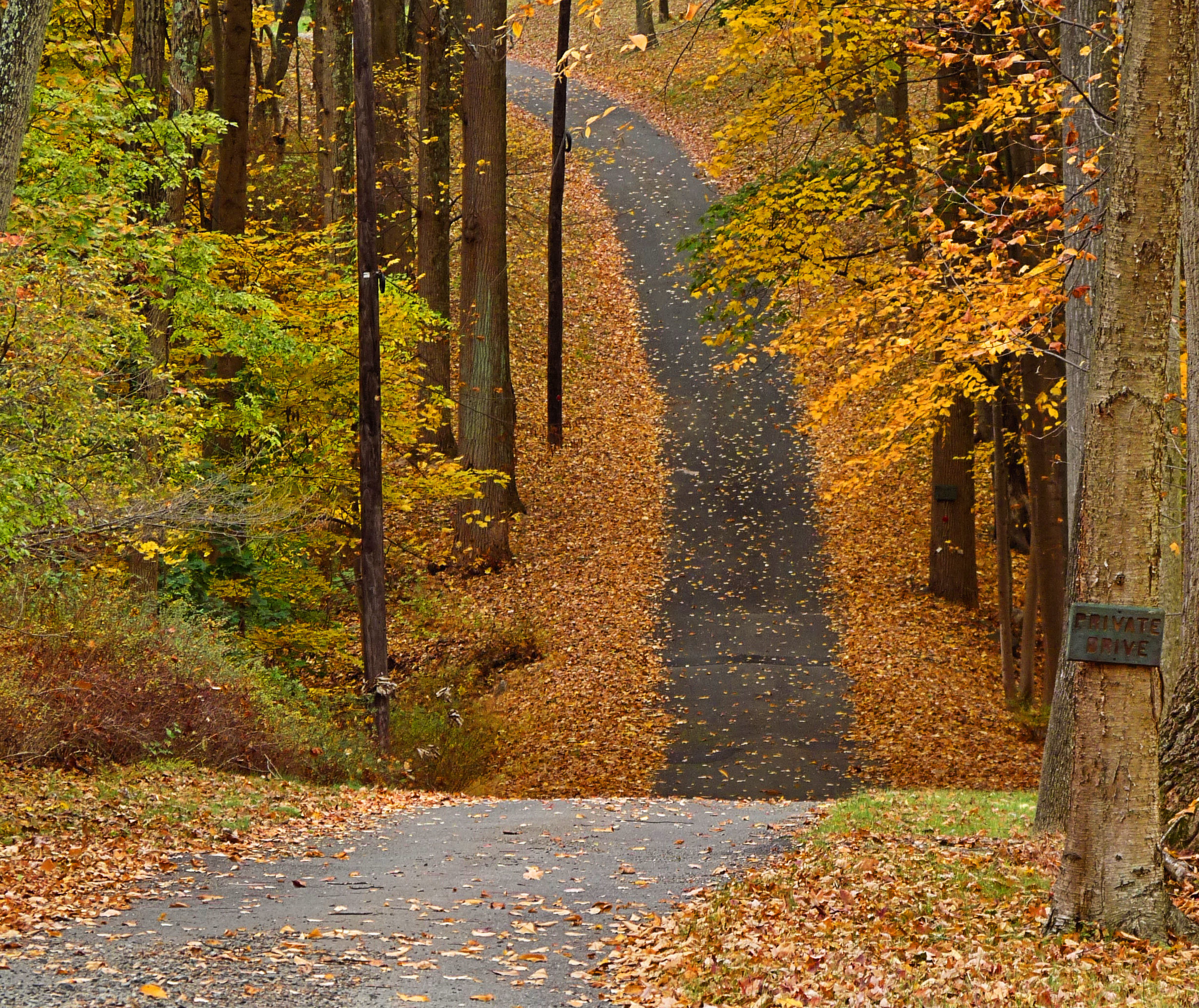
A walking trail in Basking Ridge

Somerset County parks are under the administration of the Somerset County Parks Commission. General parks are Natirar, Duke Island Park, Lord Stirling Park (part of the Great Swamp National Wildlife Refuge), Colonial Park, North Branch Park, Skillman Park, East County Park and a park in development called Raritan River Greenway. Leonard J. Buck Garden is a botanical garden of the county. In addition, the Commission manages natural parks such as the Washington Valley Park (with biking and hiking trails) and the Sourland Mountain Preserve (hiking and mountain biking trails).

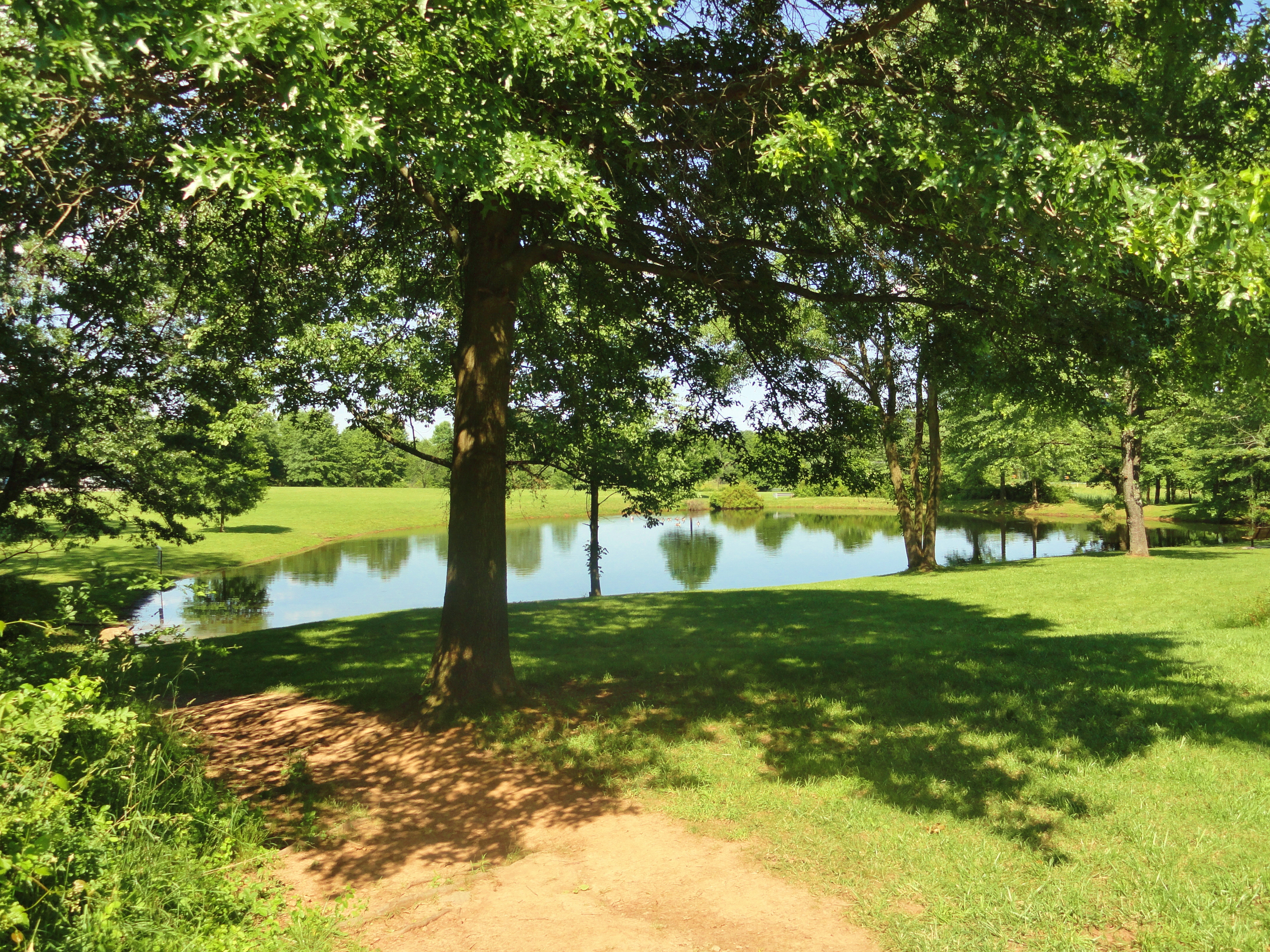
The Sourland Mountain Preserve in Hillsborough Township

The southeastern portion of Somerset County in Franklin Township includes Delaware and Raritan Canal State Park, which provides hiking, biking, and boating. The parks commission operates five public golf courses.

Trump National Golf Club in Bedminster, an exclusive golf club owned by Donald Trump, was used as a summer White House during his presidency.

== Government ==
=== County government ===
Somerset County is governed by a five-member board of county commissioners, whose members are elected at-large to three-year terms of office on a staggered basis, with either one or two seats coming up for election each year. At an annual reorganization meeting held in the first week of January, the board selects a director and deputy director from among its members. In 2016, commissioners (then known as freeholders) were paid $21,902, and the commissioner director was paid an annual salary of $22,902. The commissioners employ a full-time county administrator, Colleen Mahr, who manages the day-to-day operations of the county government. The clerk of the county commissioners oversees the work of their offices. Department heads are appointed in accordance with statute and by resolution of the board. Somerset County has about 1,100 full-time and 140 part-time employees in 52 divisions.

As of 2026, Somerset County's County Commissioners are Director Shanel Robinson (D, Franklin Township, term as commissioner ends 2027; term as director ends 2026), Deputy Director Paul Drake (D, Hillsborough Township, term as commissioner and as deputy director ends 2026), Melonie Marano (D, Green Brook Township, 2028), Elizabeth Graner (D, Bernards Township, 2026; elected to serve an unexpired term) and Sara Sooy (D, Bedminster Township, 2027).

In June 2025, Elizabeth Graner was appointed to fill the commissioner seat expiring in December 2025 that had been held by Doug Singleterry until his resignation from office to take a position as a judge of the New Jersey Superior Court. In November 2025, Graner was elected to serve the balance of the term of office. In 2018, Democrats captured their first countywide office since 1979, and in 2019 won a majority on the county commission for the first time since 1964. Republicans have not won a county-wide office since 2017.

Pursuant to Article VII Section II of the New Jersey State Constitution, each county in New Jersey is required to have three elected administrative officials known as "constitutional officers." These officers are the county clerk and county surrogate (both elected for five-year terms of office) and the county sheriff (elected for a three-year term). Constitutional officers, elected on a countywide basis are Clerk Steve Peter (D, Somerville, 2027), Sheriff Darrin Russo (D, Franklin Township, 2028) and Surrogate Bernice "Tina" Jalloh (D, Franklin Township, 2030).

The Somerset county prosecutor is John P. McDonald, who was nominated by the Governor of New Jersey Phil Murphy and confirmed by the New Jersey Senate in June 2022. Somerset County is a part of Vicinage 13 of the New Jersey Superior Court (along with Hunterdon County and Warren County), which is seated at the Somerset County Courthouse in Somerville; the assignment judge is Michael V. Cresitello.

=== Federal representatives ===
The 7th and 12th congressional districts cover the county. For the 119th United States Congress, New Jersey's 7th congressional district is represented by Thomas Kean Jr. (R, Westfield). For the 119th United States Congress, New Jersey's 12th congressional district is represented by Bonnie Watson Coleman (D, Ewing Township).

=== State representatives ===
The 21 municipalities of Somerset County are represented by five districts in the New Jersey Legislature.

| District | Senator | Assembly | Municipalities |
|---|---|---|---|
| 16th | Andrew Zwicker (D) | Mitchelle Drulis (D); Roy Freiman (D) | Branchburg, Hillsborough Township, Millstone Borough, Montgomery Township and Rocky Hill. The remainder of this district covers portions of Hunterdon County, Mercer County, and Middlesex County. |
| 17th | Bob Smith (D) | Kevin Egan (D); Joseph Danielsen (D) | Franklin Township and South Bound Brook. The remainder of this district covers portions of Middlesex County. |
| 21st | Jon Bramnick (R) | Vincent Kearney (D); Andrew Macurdy (D) | Bernards Township, Bernardsville, Far Hills, Green Brook Township, Peapack-Gladstone, Warren Township, and Watchung. The remainder of this district covers portions of Morris County, Middlesex County and Union County. |
| 22nd | Nicholas Scutari (D) | James J. Kennedy (D); Linda S. Carter (D) | North Plainfield. The remainder of this district covers portions of Union County. |
| 23rd | Doug Steinhardt (R) | John DiMaio (R); Erik Peterson (R) | Bedminster, Bound Brook, Bridgewater Township, Manville, Raritan Borough and Somerville. The remainder of this district covers Hunterdon County and Warren County. |

== Politics ==
United States presidential election results for Somerset County, New Jersey
| Year | Republican | | Democratic | | Third party(ies) | |
| Year | No. | % | No. | % | No. | % |
|---|---|---|---|---|---|---|
| 1896 | 4,388 | 60.18% | 2,608 | 35.77% | 295 | 4.05% |
| 1900 | 4,437 | 56.32% | 3,184 | 40.42% | 257 | 3.26% |
| 1904 | 4,633 | 57.57% | 3,195 | 39.70% | 219 | 2.72% |
| 1908 | 5,045 | 59.46% | 3,269 | 38.53% | 170 | 2.00% |
| 1912 | 2,068 | 27.94% | 3,146 | 42.50% | 2,188 | 29.56% |
| 1916 | 4,707 | 55.70% | 3,653 | 43.23% | 91 | 1.08% |
| 1920 | 10,962 | 71.02% | 4,192 | 27.16% | 281 | 1.82% |
| 1924 | 12,986 | 71.12% | 4,143 | 22.69% | 1,131 | 6.19% |
| 1928 | 16,386 | 66.66% | 8,120 | 33.03% | 74 | 0.30% |
| 1932 | 15,317 | 54.18% | 12,345 | 43.66% | 611 | 2.16% |
| 1936 | 15,806 | 49.57% | 15,987 | 50.14% | 94 | 0.29% |
| 1940 | 20,169 | 54.87% | 16,490 | 44.86% | 96 | 0.26% |
| 1944 | 20,266 | 58.29% | 14,467 | 41.61% | 37 | 0.11% |
| 1948 | 22,034 | 59.77% | 14,104 | 38.26% | 724 | 1.96% |
| 1952 | 31,239 | 63.34% | 18,007 | 36.51% | 74 | 0.15% |
| 1956 | 37,930 | 71.85% | 14,529 | 27.52% | 330 | 0.63% |
| 1960 | 36,200 | 55.81% | 28,489 | 43.92% | 174 | 0.27% |
| 1964 | 28,416 | 39.32% | 43,659 | 60.41% | 195 | 0.27% |
| 1968 | 42,459 | 54.11% | 27,580 | 35.14% | 8,436 | 10.75% |
| 1972 | 56,524 | 66.03% | 26,537 | 31.00% | 2,544 | 2.97% |
| 1976 | 51,260 | 57.15% | 36,258 | 40.43% | 2,173 | 2.42% |
| 1980 | 52,591 | 57.21% | 29,470 | 32.06% | 9,867 | 10.73% |
| 1984 | 66,303 | 66.77% | 31,924 | 32.15% | 1,069 | 1.08% |
| 1988 | 67,658 | 63.71% | 37,406 | 35.22% | 1,129 | 1.06% |
| 1992 | 56,044 | 46.39% | 42,867 | 35.48% | 21,902 | 18.13% |
| 1996 | 51,869 | 45.93% | 50,673 | 44.87% | 10,387 | 9.20% |
| 2000 | 59,725 | 49.61% | 56,232 | 46.71% | 4,420 | 3.67% |
| 2004 | 72,508 | 51.69% | 66,476 | 47.39% | 1,295 | 0.92% |
| 2008 | 70,085 | 46.28% | 79,321 | 52.38% | 2,024 | 1.34% |
| 2012 | 66,603 | 46.52% | 74,592 | 52.10% | 1,985 | 1.39% |
| 2016 | 65,505 | 41.70% | 85,689 | 54.55% | 5,898 | 3.75% |
| 2020 | 71,996 | 38.74% | 111,173 | 59.82% | 2,690 | 1.45% |
| 2024 | 74,101 | 41.77% | 98,790 | 55.68% | 4,521 | 2.55% |

In the 2008, Barack Obama became the first Democratic presidential nominee to carry the county since Lyndon Johnson in 1964, and only the second since 1936. Obama won Somerset by a 6.1% margin over John McCain, with Obama carrying the state by 15.5% over McCain. Somerset's growing Democratic trend at the presidential level has largely been spurred by the rapid growth of the overwhelmingly Democratic Franklin Township in the county's southeast corner. The county has voted Democratic in every election since, with the 2020 election seeing Democrat Joe Biden win the largest share of the vote in the county for a Democrat since 1964, as the county voted more Democratic than the state as a whole for the first time since 1912. The county also voted to the left of the state in 2024, when Democratic nominee Kamala Harris won the county by 14%, despite winning New Jersey by just 6%.

As of October 1, 2021, there were a total of 262,410 registered voters in Somerset County, of whom 92,921 (35.4%) were registered as Democrats, 66,455 (25.3%) were registered as Republicans and 100,367 (38.2%) were registered as unaffiliated. There were 2,667 voters (1.0%) registered to other parties. Among the county's 2010 Census population, 67.1% were registered to vote, including 75.% of those ages 18 and over.

Senate Class 1 election results

United States Senate election results for Somerset County, New Jersey1
| Year | Republican | | Democratic | | Third party(ies) | |
| Year | No. | % | No. | % | No. | % |
|---|---|---|---|---|---|---|
| 2024 | 71,652 | 41.84% | 95,344 | 55.67% | 4,272 | 2.49% |
| 2018 | 61,373 | 45.07% | 70,359 | 51.67% | 4,450 | 3.27% |
| 2012 | 63,349 | 46.49% | 70,264 | 51.57% | 2,645 | 1.94% |
| 2006 | 46,720 | 50.89% | 42,242 | 46.01% | 2,839 | 3.09% |
| 2000 | 69,045 | 58.61% | 45,948 | 39.00% | 2,811 | 2.39% |
| 1994 | 42,812 | 55.80% | 31,978 | 41.68% | 1,931 | 2.52% |
| 1988 | 53,969 | 52.52% | 47,648 | 46.37% | 1,138 | 1.11% |
| 1982 | 48,067 | 68.27% | 22,030 | 31.29% | 313 | 0.44% |

Senate Class 2 election results

United States Senate election results for Somerset County, New Jersey2
| Year | Republican | | Democratic | | Third party(ies) | |
| Year | No. | % | No. | % | No. | % |
|---|---|---|---|---|---|---|
| 2020 | 75,622 | 41.14% | 105,681 | 57.49% | 2,520 | 1.37% |
| 2014 | 37,835 | 49.52% | 37,124 | 48.59% | 1,448 | 1.90% |
| 2013 | 29,304 | 50.16% | 28,539 | 48.85% | 578 | 0.99% |
| 2008 | 71,392 | 50.27% | 66,939 | 47.13% | 3,691 | 2.60% |
| 2002 | 45,590 | 54.26% | 36,476 | 43.42% | 1,951 | 2.32% |
| 1996 | 58,393 | 53.96% | 44,748 | 41.35% | 5,068 | 4.68% |
| 1990 | 38,426 | 56.30% | 27,508 | 40.30% | 2,320 | 3.40% |
| 1984 | 38,862 | 40.41% | 55,757 | 57.97% | 1,562 | 1.62% |

=== State elections ===
Governor election results

Gubernatorial election results for Somerset County, New Jersey
| Year | Republican | | Democratic | | Third party(ies) | |
| Year | No. | % | No. | % | No. | % |
|---|---|---|---|---|---|---|
| 1953 | 15,737 | 45.91% | 17,921 | 52.29% | 617 | 1.80% |
| 1957 | 20,844 | 45.47% | 24,802 | 54.10% | 200 | 0.44% |
| 1961 | 28,596 | 55.14% | 22,784 | 43.94% | 477 | 0.92% |
| 1965 | 27,207 | 46.54% | 29,659 | 50.74% | 1,588 | 2.72% |
| 1969 | 45,348 | 68.81% | 18,905 | 28.68% | 1,653 | 2.51% |
| 1973 | 20,933 | 33.86% | 39,864 | 64.48% | 1,024 | 1.66% |
| 1977 | 40,164 | 56.67% | 29,286 | 41.32% | 1,421 | 2.01% |
| 1981 | 43,697 | 62.55% | 25,121 | 35.96% | 1,045 | 1.50% |
| 1985 | 44,502 | 75.60% | 13,601 | 23.11% | 761 | 1.29% |
| 1989 | 34,815 | 47.27% | 37,159 | 50.45% | 1,679 | 2.28% |
| 1993 | 55,444 | 59.35% | 36,046 | 38.58% | 1,933 | 2.07% |
| 1997 | 51,465 | 57.37% | 29,089 | 32.43% | 9,154 | 10.20% |
| 2001 | 44,815 | 52.21% | 39,110 | 45.57% | 1,903 | 2.22% |
| 2005 | 49,406 | 52.83% | 40,459 | 43.26% | 3,661 | 3.91% |
| 2009 | 57,481 | 56.23% | 35,089 | 34.33% | 9,651 | 9.44% |
| 2013 | 58,981 | 67.55% | 26,913 | 30.82% | 1,419 | 1.63% |
| 2017 | 44,231 | 47.48% | 46,825 | 50.26% | 2,107 | 2.26% |
| 2021 | 54,264 | 47.74% | 58,585 | 51.54% | 823 | 0.72% |
| 2025 | 56,095 | 39.93% | 83,355 | 59.33% | 1,037 | 0.74% |

== Education ==
=== School districts ===
School districts include:

K-12

- Bernards Township School District
- Bound Brook School District
- Bridgewater-Raritan Regional School District
- Franklin Township Public Schools
- Hillsborough Township School District
- Manville School District
- Montgomery Township School District
- North Plainfield School District
- Somerset Hills School District
- Somerville Public Schools

Secondary

- Somerset County Vocational and Technical School District
- Watchung Hills Regional High School

Elementary

- Bedminster Township School District
- Branchburg Township School District
- Green Brook School District
- South Bound Brook School District
- Warren Township Schools
- Watchung Borough Schools

=== Colleges and universities ===
Somerset County is home to two colleges:

- Raritan Valley Community College (RVCC), North Branch section of Branchburg Township (public). Rutgers University has a partnership with Raritan Valley Community College which allows students who have an accredited associate degree to complete a bachelor's degree by attending Rutgers classes at RVCC's North Branch campus. The degree completion program is specifically designed to cater to the transfer student looking to complete their bachelor's degree while staying close to home.
- Somerset Christian College, now known as Pillar College, is located in the Zarephath section of Franklin Township (private).

Alma White College (which operated from 1921 to 1978) was a private college located in Zarephath. Beginning in 1931 the college operated WAWZ 1380 on the AM radio dial. The station continued to 1984 after the school closed. The building is now occupied by Somerset Christian College.

=== Private schools ===
Private schools in the county include Gill St. Bernard's School (Gladstone), Immaculata High School (Somerville), Mount St. Mary Academy, (Watchung), Pingry School, (Martinsville), Purnell School, (Pottersville), and Rutgers Preparatory School (Somerset).

Somerset Hills Learning Institute, founded in 1998 and located in Bedminster Township, educates children on the autism spectrum by utilizing the principles of applied behavior analysis. In 2024, a local ShopRite store started selling salads grown by and packed by students in the school's hydroponics career training program.

== Municipalities ==
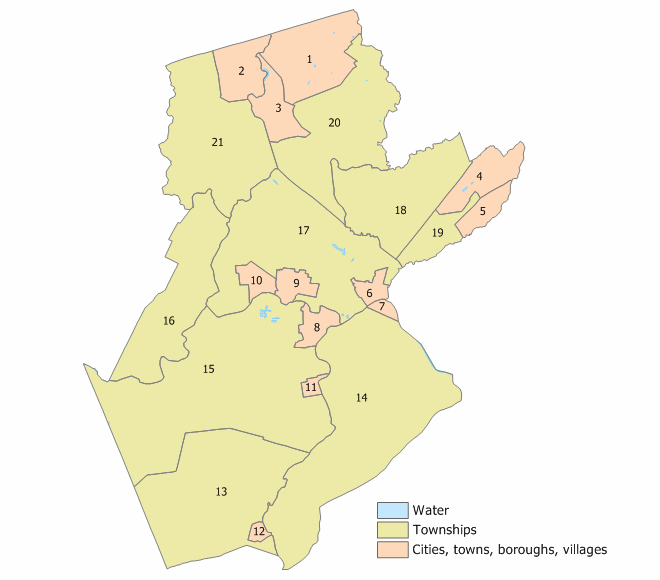
Index map of Somerset County municipalities (click to see an index key)

Interactive map of municipalities in Somerset County.

The 21 municipalities in Somerset County (with 2010 Census data for population, housing units, and area) are listed below. Other unincorporated communities in the county are listed alongside their parent municipality (or municipalities, as the case may be). These areas include census-designated places (CDPs), which the United States Census Bureau created for enumeration purposes within a township. Other communities, historical areas, unincorporated areas, and enclaves that exist within a municipality are also listed.

| Municipality (with map key) | Map key | Mun. type | Pop. | Housing units | Total area | Water area | Land area | Pop. density | Housing density | School district | Communities |
|---|---|---|---|---|---|---|---|---|---|---|---|
| Bedminster | 21 | township | 8,272 | 4,349 | 26.30 | 0.22 | 26.08 | 313.1 | 166.8 | Somerset Hills (9-12) (S/R); Bedminster Township (PK-8) | Bedminster CDP (1,244); The Hills CDP (part; 11,410); Lamington CDP (135); Pluckemin CDP (359); Pottersville CDP (part; 467) |
| Bernards Township | 20 | township | 27,830 | 10,103 | 24.06 | 0.13 | 23.93 | 1,113.6 | 422.1 | Bernards Township | Basking Ridge CDP (7,196); The Hills CDP (part; 11,410); Liberty Corner CDP (1,877); Lyons CDP (5,345) |
| Bernardsville | 1 | borough | 7,893 | 2,871 | 12.98 | 0.08 | 12.91 | 597.2 | 222.5 | Somerset Hills | |
| Bound Brook | 6 | borough | 11,988 | 3,816 | 1.69 | 0.04 | 1.66 | 6,269.6 | 2,300.0 | Bound Brook | |
| Branchburg | 16 | township | 14,940 | 5,419 | 20.28 | 0.24 | 20.04 | 721.4 | 270.4 | Somerville (9-12) (S/R); Branchburg (PK-8) | Neshanic Station CDP (part; 5,224); North Branch |
| Bridgewater Township | 17 | township | 45,977 | 16,657 | 32.51 | 0.47 | 32.04 | 1,387.9 | 519.9 | Bridgewater-Raritan | Bradley Gardens CDP (14,077); Bridgewater Center CDP (6,082); Finderne CDP (6,392); Green Knoll CDP (6,594); Martinsville CDP (12,147) |
| Far Hills | 3 | borough | 924 | 418 | 4.88 | 0.08 | 4.80 | 191.6 | 87.1 | Somerset Hills | |
| Franklin Township | 14 | township | 68,364 | 24,426 | 46.85 | 0.70 | 46.15 | 1,350.0 | 529.3 | Franklin Township | Blackwells Mills CDP (part; 9,473); Clyde CDP (243); East Franklin CDP (9,788); East Millstone CDP (588); East Rocky Hill CDP (468); Franklin Center CDP (6,803); Franklin Park CDP (13,430); Griggstown CDP (835); Kingston CDP (part; 271); Middlebush CDP (2,368); Pleasant Plains CDP (792); Rockingham; Six Mile Run CDP (3,383); Somerset CDP (22,968); Ten Mile Run CDP (2,055); Voorhees CDP (1,517); Weston CDP (2,023); Zarephath CDP (69) |
| Green Brook Township | 19 | township | 7,281 | 2,448 | 4.48 | 0.01 | 4.47 | 1,610.5 | 547.3 | Watchung Hills (9-12); Green Brook (PK-8) | |
| Hillsborough Township | 15 | township | 43,276 | 14,030 | 55.00 | 0.47 | 54.54 | 702.3 | 257.3 | Hillsborough | Amwell; Belle Mead CDP (part; 5,569); Blackwells Mills CDP (part; 9,473); Cloverhill; Flagtown CDP (1,070) Hillsborough CDP (22,214); Neshanic CDP (854); South Branch; Zion |
| Manville | 8 | borough | 10,953 | 4,277 | 2.45 | 0.09 | 2.36 | 4,382.0 | 1,811.9 | Manville | |
| Millstone | 11 | borough | 448 | 167 | 0.76 | 0.02 | 0.74 | 566.5 | 226.3 | Hillsborough (S/R) | |
| Montgomery Township | 13 | township | 23,690 | 7,902 | 32.48 | 0.17 | 32.31 | 688.8 | 244.6 | Montgomery | Amwell; Belle Mead CDP (part; 5,569); Blawenburg CDP (287); Dutchtown; Harlingen CDP (430); Skillman CDP (237); Stoutsburg; Zion |
| North Plainfield | 5 | borough | 22,808 | 7,848 | 2.81 | 0.01 | 2.79 | 7,850.0 | 2,808.5 | North Plainfield | |
| Peapack-Gladstone | 2 | borough | 2,558 | 949 | 5.85 | 0.04 | 5.81 | 444.5 | 163.4 | Somerset Hills | Gladstone |
| Raritan | 10 | borough | 7,835 | 2,847 | 2.04 | 0.04 | 1.99 | 3,452.2 | 1,428.3 | Bridgewater-Raritan | |
| Rocky Hill | 12 | borough | 743 | 292 | 0.62 | 0.00 | 0.62 | 1,101.4 | 471.6 | Montgomery (S/R) | |
| Somerville | 9 | borough | 12,346 | 4,951 | 2.36 | 0.03 | 2.33 | 5,189.5 | 2,123.8 | Somerville | |
| South Bound Brook | 7 | borough | 4,863 | 1,865 | 0.75 | 0.10 | 0.66 | 6,933.8 | 2,834.0 | Bound Brook (9-12) (S/R); South Bound Brook (PK-8) | |
| Warren Township | 18 | township | 15,923 | 5,258 | 19.64 | 0.08 | 19.57 | 782.5 | 268.7 | Watchung Hills (9-12); Warren Township (PK-8) | |
| Watchung | 4 | borough | 6,449 | 2,234 | 6.05 | 0.03 | 6.03 | 962.7 | 370.7 | Watchung Hills (9-12); Watchung (PK-8) | |
| Somerset County | | county | 345,361 | 123,127 | 304.86 | 3.04 | 301.81 | 1,071.7 | 408.0 | | |

== Transportation ==
=== Roads and highways ===
Somerset County is served by a number of different routes. As of May 2010, the county had a total of 1,714.99 miles (2,760.01 km) of roadways, of which 1,370.80 miles (2,206.09 km) were maintained by the local municipality, 234.23 miles (376.96 km) by Somerset County and 109.96 miles (176.96 km) by the New Jersey Department of Transportation.

Major county roads that pass through include County Route 512, County Route 514, County Route 518, County Route 523, County Route 525, County Route 527, County Route 529, County Route 531 and County Route 533. The two state routes which traverse through the county are Route 27 (only in Franklin) and Route 28. U.S. Routes in the county are U.S. Route 22, U.S. Route 202 and U.S. Route 206. The two Interstates which pass through Somerset County are Interstate 78 and Interstate 287.

It was planned for Interstate 95 to run along the Somerset Freeway from its proposed southern end in Hopewell Township, Mercer County to Franklin Township at I-287 in the 1960s. However, the plan was canceled in 1983. Part of Route 18 is the New Brunswick border of Somerset.

=== Public transportation ===
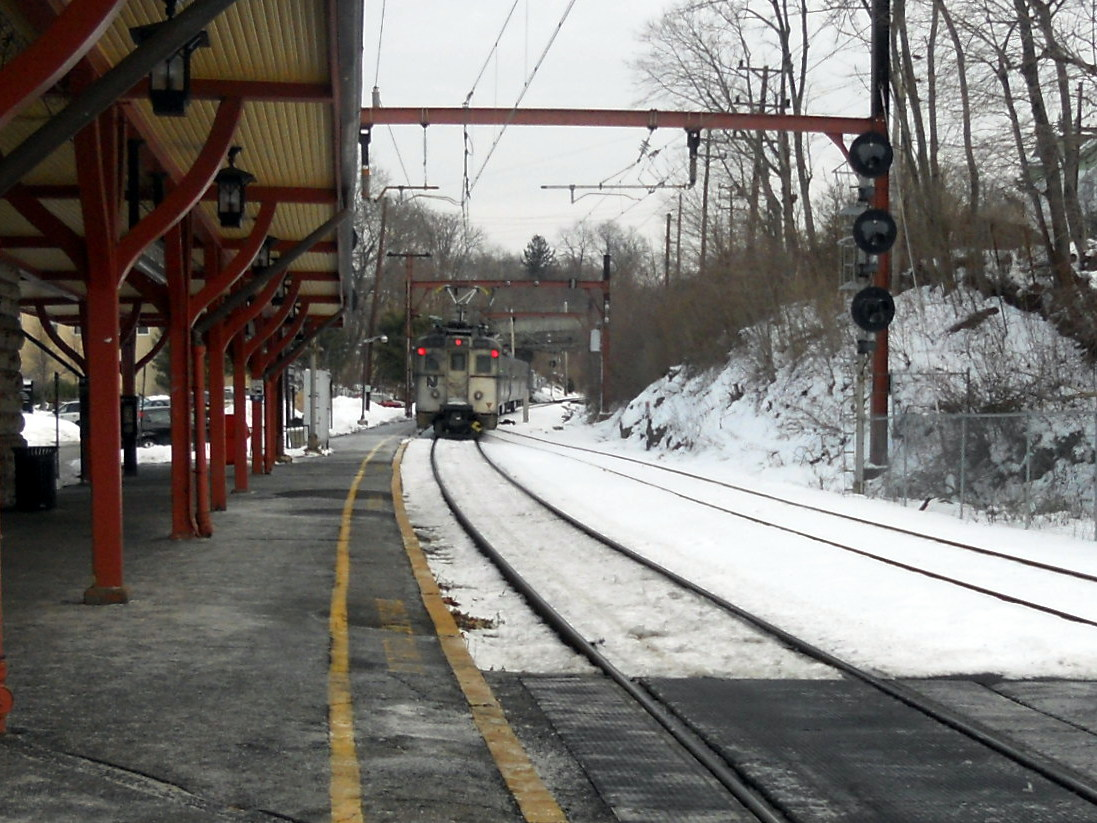
Bernardsville station

NJ Transit provides train service on the Gladstone Branch and the Raritan Valley Line. Public bus transportation is provided by several transit agencies.

NJ Transit provides bus service to the Port Authority Bus Terminal in Midtown Manhattan, as well as service to major cities in New Jersey and within Somerset County. Ridewise provides three SCOOT shuttles, as well as DASH buses and CAT buses.

== See also ==
- 2024 New Jersey drone sightings
- Colonel Routh Goshen
- Duke Gardens
- Hall-Mills Murder
- Meadows Foundation (New Jersey)
- National Register of Historic Places listings in Somerset County, New Jersey
- Old Dutch Parsonage
- Rockingham
- Six-Mile Run Reservoir
