= Bernards Township School District =

School district in Somerset County, New Jersey, US

Address
- 101 Peachtree Road Basking Ridge, Somerset County, New Jersey, 07920
- Coordinates: 40.691518°N 74.544191°W

District information
- Grades: PreK to 12
- Superintendent: Nick Markarian (until September 1, 2026); Kristin Fox (starting September 1, 2026)
- Business administrator: James Rollo
- Schools: 6

Students and staff
- Enrollment: 4,874 (as of 2020–21)
- Faculty: 456.1 FTEs
- Student–teacher ratio: 10.7:1

Other information
- District Factor Group: J
- Website: www.bernardsboe.com
Ind.	Per pupil	District spending	Rank (*)	K-12 average	%± vs. average
1A	Total Spending	$17,357	34	$18,891	−8.1%
1	Budgetary Cost	13,897	39	14,783	−6.0%
2	Classroom Instruction	8,331	34	8,763	−4.9%
6	Support Services	2,279	50	2,392	−4.7%
8	Administrative Cost	1,196	13	1,485	−19.5%
10	Operations & Maintenance	1,776	65	1,783	−0.4%
13	Extracurricular Activities	317	77	268	18.3%
16	Median Teacher Salary	62,380	36	64,043
Data from NJDoE 2014 Taxpayers' Guide to Education Spending. *Of K-12 districts with more than 3,500 students. Lowest spending=1; Highest=103

The Bernards Township School District is a comprehensive community public school district, serving students in pre-kindergarten through twelfth grade from Bernards Township in Somerset County, in the U.S. state of New Jersey.

As of the 2020–21 school year, the district, comprised of six schools, had an enrollment of 4,874 students and 456.1 classroom teachers (on an FTE basis), for a student–teacher ratio of 10.7:1.

The district offers its Integrated Preschool Program for children on the autism spectrum, utilizing the principles of applied behavior analysis.

== History ==
Paula Grossman was a music teacher who was dismissed from a teaching position at one of the district's elementary schools after her sex reassignment surgery in 1971. She rejected an offer from the district under which she would give up her tenure and transfer to the high school, where the courses she would be allowed to teach would be limited. After she was fired, she sued the school district on the basis of sex discrimination. Her lawsuit, Grossman v. Bernards Township Board of Education received media attention nationwide, but was ultimately unsuccessful.

The district had been classified by the New Jersey Department of Education as being in District Factor Group "J", the highest of eight groupings. District Factor Groups organize districts statewide to allow comparison by common socioeconomic characteristics of the local districts. From lowest socioeconomic status to highest, the categories are A, B, CD, DE, FG, GH, I and J.

== Awards, recognition and rankings ==
During the 2009-10 school year, Ridge High School was awarded the Blue Ribbon School Award of Excellence by the United States Department of Education, the highest award an American school can receive. The school had also won the award for the 1986-87 school year. Mount Prospect Elementary School was one of 11 in the state to be recognized in 2014 by the United States Department of Education's National Blue Ribbon Schools Program. In 2015, Liberty Corner School was one of 15 schools in New Jersey, and one of nine public schools, recognized as a National Blue Ribbon School in the exemplary high performing category by the U.S. Department of Education. In 2023, Oak Street School was one of nine schools in New Jersey that was recognized as a National Blue Ribbon School.

Ridge High School was ranked 37th-best in America and second-best non-magnet high school by Newsweek in 2015, and ranked 71st overall in America (and third-highest ranked non-magnet school in New Jersey) by the magazine in 2016.

William Annin Middle School was chosen as a "School To Watch" in 2016, one of three middle schools in the state selected by the Schools To Watch Program.

== Schools ==
Schools in the district (with 2020–21 enrollment data from the National Center for Education Statistics) are:

Elementary schools

- Cedar Hill Elementary School with 483 students in grades K–5
  - Krissy Uhler, principal
- Liberty Corner Elementary School with 466 students in grades K–5
  - James Oliver, principal
- Mount Prospect Elementary School with 507 students in grades PreK–5
  - Joanne Hozeny, principal
- Oak Street Elementary School with 406 students in grades K–5
  - Holly Foley, principal

Middle school

- William Annin Middle School with 1,201 students in grades 6–8. The school is one of the few in the United States to have a seismograph, which is part of the Lamont–Doherty Earth Observatory Cooperative Seismographic Network.
  - Karen Hudock, principal

High school

- Ridge High School with 1,794 students in grades 9–12
  - Russell Lazovick, principal (until September 1, 2026)
  - Cheryl Howarth, principal (starting September 1, 2026)

== Administration ==
Core members of the district's administration are:

- Nick Markarian, superintendent (retiring September 1, 2026)
- Kristin Fox, superintendent (starting September 1, 2026)
- James Rollo, business administrator and board secretary

== Board of education ==
The district's board of education is comprised of nine members who set policy and oversee the fiscal and educational operation of the district through its administration. As a Type II school district, the board's trustees are elected directly by voters to serve three-year terms of office on a staggered basis, with three seats up for election each year held (since 2012) as part of the November general election. The board appoints a superintendent to oversee the district's day-to-day operations and a business administrator to supervise the business functions of the district.
