= Somerset Hills School District =

School district in Somerset County, New Jersey, US

Coordinates: 40.721698°N 74.567081°W

Address
- 25 Olcott Avenue Bernardsville, Somerset County, New Jersey, 07924; United States

District information
- Grades: PreK-12
- Superintendent: Brian Brotschul
- Business administrator: Jinnee DeMarco
- Schools: 3

Students and staff
- Enrollment: 1,761 (as of 2022–23)
- Faculty: 151.3 FTEs
- Student–teacher ratio: 11.6:1

Other information
- District Factor Group: I
- Website: www.shsd.org
Ind.	Per pupil	District spending	Rank (*)	K-12 average	%± vs. average
1A	Total Spending	$20,341	60	$18,891	7.7%
1	Budgetary Cost	15,101	52	14,783	2.2%
2	Classroom Instruction	8,504	43	8,763	−3.0%
6	Support Services	2,800	60	2,392	17.1%
8	Administrative Cost	1,569	42	1,485	5.7%
10	Operations & Maintenance	1,624	38	1,783	−8.9%
13	Extracurricular Activities	581	64	268	116.8%
16	Median Teacher Salary	68,944	55	64,043
Data from NJDoE 2014 Taxpayers' Guide to Education Spending. *Of K-12 districts with 1,800-3,500 students. Lowest spending=1; Highest=68

The Somerset Hills School District is a comprehensive regional public school district serving students in pre-kindergarten through twelfth grade from four communities in Somerset County, in the U.S. state of New Jersey. The district serves students from the boroughs of Bernardsville, Far Hills and Peapack-Gladstone, along with students from the township of Bedminster (grades 9–12) who attend the district's high school as part of a sending/receiving relationship.

As of the 2022–23 school year, the district, comprised of three schools, had an enrollment of 1,761 students and 151.3 classroom teachers (on an FTE basis), for a student–teacher ratio of 11.6:1.

The district is classified by the New Jersey Department of Education as being in District Factor Group "I", the second-highest of eight groupings. District Factor Groups organize districts statewide to allow comparison by common socioeconomic characteristics of the local districts. From lowest socioeconomic status to highest, the categories are A, B, CD, DE, FG, GH, I and J.

== Schools ==
Schools in the district (with 2022–23 enrollment data from the National Center for Education Statistics) are:

Elementary school

- Marion T. Bedwell Elementary School with 453 students in grades PreK–4
  - Keith Koellhoffer, principal

Middle school

- Bernardsville Middle School with 458 students in grades 5–8
  - Lisa Garafalo, principal

High school

- Bernards High School with 812 students in grades 9–12
  - Scott Neigel, principal

== Administration ==
Core members of the district's administration are:

- Brian Brotschul, superintendent
- Jinnee DeMarco, business administrator and board secretary

== Board of education ==
The district's board of education is comprised of nine elected members (and one appointed member) who set policy and oversee the fiscal and educational operation of the district through its administration. As a Type II school district, the board's trustees are elected directly by voters to serve three-year terms of office on a staggered basis, with three seats up for election each year held (since 2012) as part of the November general election. The board appoints a superintendent to oversee the district's day-to-day operations and a business administrator to supervise the business functions of the district. The seats on the board are allocated to the constituent municipalities based on population, with six seats assigned to Bernardsville, two to Peapack-Gladstone and one to Far Hills, with an additional representative appointed annually from the sending district of Bedminster.
