= Gershom Mott =

US Army general

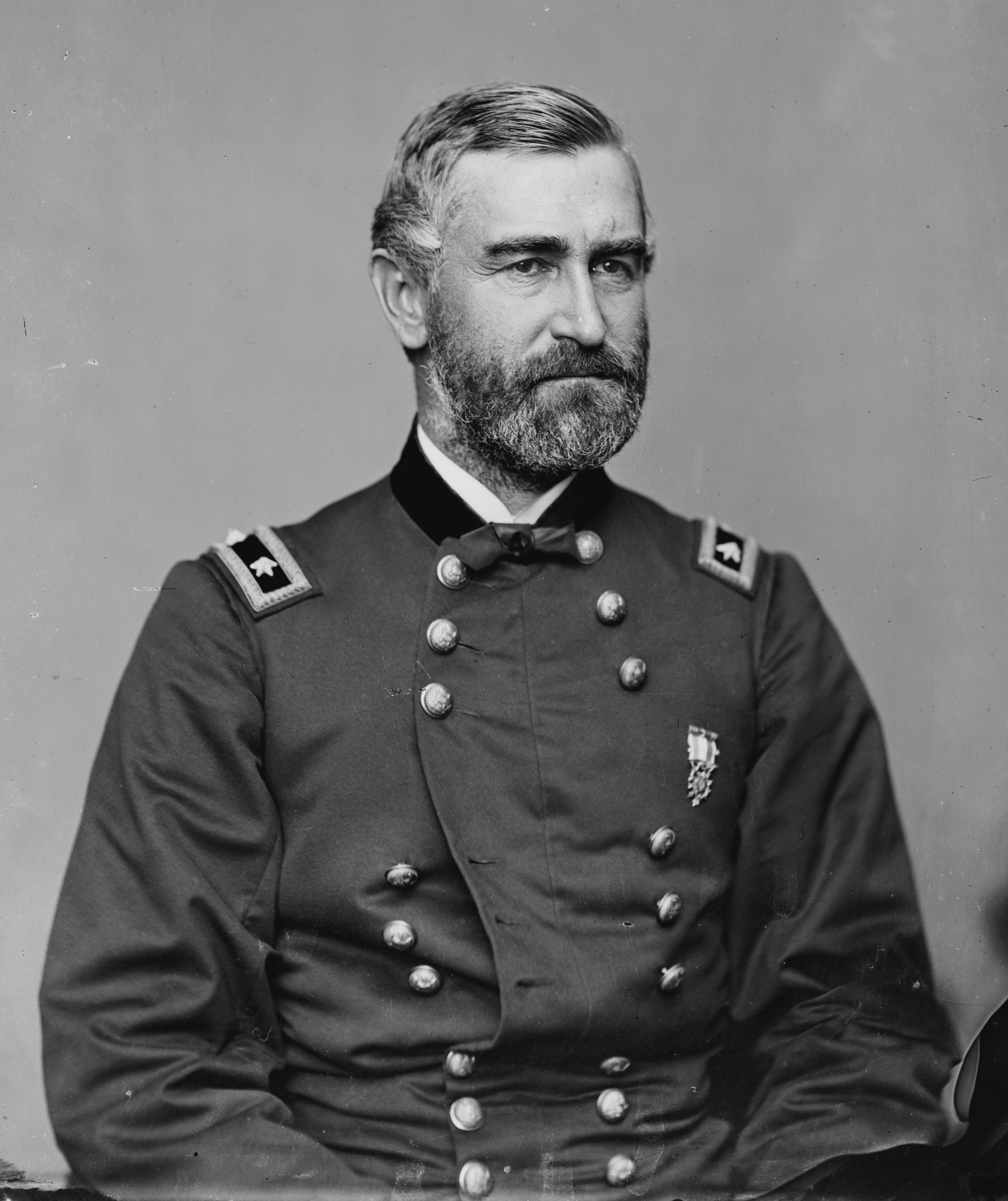
- Born: April 7, 1822; Lamberton, New Jersey
- Died: November 29, 1884 (aged 62); New York City, New York
- Burial place: Riverview Cemetery, Trenton, New Jersey
- Military career
- Allegiance: United States of America; Union
- Branch: United States Army; Union Army
- Service years: 1847–1848, 1861–1866
- Rank: Major General
- Commands: 6th New Jersey Volunteer Infantry
- Conflicts: American Civil War

Gershom Mott (April 7, 1822 – November 29, 1884) was a United States Army officer and a General in the Union Army, a commander in the Eastern Theater of the American Civil War.

== Early life ==
General Mott was born in Lamberton, New Jersey, a town outside of Trenton. He was the grandson of American Revolutionary War Captain John Mott, who guided General George Washington’s army down the Delaware River to the celebrated victory at the Battle of Trenton. The reliability of this claim has recently come under question. His parents were Gershom and Phebe (or Phoebe) Rose Scudder Mott. Gershom Mott was the youngest of five children. He received his education at the Trenton Academy, which is now the Trenton Public Library (Main Branch). Gershom Mott began to work when he was only fourteen years old as a sales clerk in a dry goods store in New York City. He became a second lieutenant in the 10th U.S. Infantry during the Mexican–American War. On August 8, 1849, Gershom Mott married Elizabeth Smith. They had one child, Kate, who recorded and published the family genealogy in later years. From 1849 to 1861, Mott held a variety of jobs in New Jersey with the Lamberton Port, Bordentown, Delaware & Raritan Canal Company, and the Bordentown Bank.

== Civil War ==
In the summer after the start of the Civil War, Mott was appointed the lieutenant colonel of the 5th New Jersey Infantry Regiment, part of the Army of the Potomac. His regiment fought in the Peninsula Campaign and shortly after the Battle of Williamsburg he was promoted to colonel and command of the 6th New Jersey Volunteer Infantry. He was commended for bravery in the Battle of Seven Pines, but he and his regiment saw little action in the Seven Days Battles.

During the Second Battle of Bull Run, Mott was severely wounded in the arm and for his bravery was promoted to brigadier general on September 7, 1862. He was forced to recuperate during the Battle of Antietam and returned to the Army just after the Battle of Fredericksburg. Mott led a brigade in the III Corps at the Battle of Chancellorsville, but was again seriously wounded and missed the subsequent Gettysburg campaign. His brigade was commanded by Colonel George C. Burling during that engagement.

Mott returned to duty in the fall of 1863 and led his brigade in the Bristoe and Mine Run campaigns. When the III Corps was discontinued in the spring of 1864, its 1st Division, which had once been Joe Hooker's command, became the 4th Division of the II Corps, now commanded by Mott. The III Corps veterans were not happy with the disappearance of their outfit and morale consequently suffered. The division was driven from the field in panic during the fighting in the Wilderness, and both II Corps commander Maj. Gen Winfield Hancock and 1st Division commander Maj. Gen Francis Barlow held an extremely low opinion of them. On May 10, during the third day of action at Spotsylvania, Mott's division was ordered to support an assault by Col. Emory Upton's brigade. The demoralized troops however never got closer than a quarter of a mile from the Confederate lines as a barrage of artillery fire sent them running. After Spotsylvania, the division, which had ceased to be a usable fighting force, was disbanded and its remnants scattered among other divisions. Mott continued as a brigade commander under Maj. Gen. David B. Birney and was restored to division command (3rd Division, II Corps) in July, performing well during the Siege of Petersburg and the Appomattox Campaign. He was one of the few Union officers to be commended for his actions in the disastrous Battle of the Crater, for which he was given a brevet promotion to major general. Three days before the Confederate surrender at Appomattox, Mott was wounded in the leg at the Battle of Amelia Springs. (Régis de Trobriand served as acting division commander for the remainder of the campaign.) He attained by war's end a reputation for competency and bravery. On December 1, 1865, he was promoted to major general, effective May 26, 1865.

== Postbellum ==
Mott resigned his volunteer commission on February 20, 1866. In 1868 he was offered a commission as a colonel in the regular army, but chose to remain in civilian life. He served briefly as an executive with the Camden & Amboy Railroad and as a banker, but spent the remainder of his life in various offices in the state government of New Jersey: state treasurer, warden of the New Jersey State Prison, and major general and commander of the New Jersey National Guard (1873–1884). He died in New York City and was given a full military funeral. He is buried in Riverview Cemetery in Trenton.

== Namesake ==
For Gershom Mott's dedication to New Jersey and his country the residents of the city of Trenton renamed the Sixth Ward School Gershom Mott Elementary School in 1896.

Fort Mott in Pennsville, NJ was also named for General Mott. It was an Endicott era fort, which, in conjunction with Fort Delaware and Fort DuPont served to protect the mouth of the Delaware River.

Mott Street in Jamesburg NJ is named for him, one of multiple streets in the borough named for significant officers and soldiers who served during the Civil War.

== See also ==
- List of American Civil War generals (Union)

== Notes ==
Military offices
Preceded by David B. Birney	Commander of the II Corps (ACW); February 15, 1864 - February 17, 1864	Succeeded by Nelson A. Miles
Preceded by Andrew A. Humphreys	Commander of the II Corps (ACW); June 9, 1865 - June 20, 1865	Succeeded by Andrew A. Humphreys
