= John Honeyman =

American spy and British informant for George Washington

- Born: 1729; County Armagh, Kingdom of Ireland
- Died: August 18, 1822 (aged 93); Lamington, New Jersey
- Burial place: Lamington Presbyterian Church Cemetery
- Occupations: Soldier, spy
- Spouse(s): Mary Henry (1764-1801), Mrs. Elizabeth Estel-Burrows (1804-?)
- Espionage activity
- Allegiance: United States
- Service branch: American Revolutionary War
- Service years: 1775-1783
- Operations: Battle of Trenton

John Honeyman (1729—August 18, 1822) was an American spy and British informant for George Washington, primarily responsible for spreading disinformation and gathering the intelligence crucial to Washington's victory in the Battle of Trenton.

== Early life and career ==
Born in Ireland, purportedly in Armagh, Honeyman was of Scottish descent. The son of a poor farmer, he received little formal education but was nevertheless literate and learned several trades, including weaving. He worked as a farmer until the age of 29 and then entered the British Army to fight in the French and Indian War in 1758.

He sailed to Canada aboard the frigate Boyne on which Colonel James Wolfe was also embarked. One day during the Atlantic Ocean crossing, Honeyman was on watch on the deck when Wolfe, who was about to descend a stairway, tripped and would have surely fallen if he had not been caught by Honeyman. Wolfe showed his gratitude by taking down Honeyman's name and promising to look out for the young private.

Upon landing off the Saint Lawrence River, Honeyman's unit was almost immediately put into action against the French during the Siege of Louisbourg which ended after 48 days on July 26, 1758. Wolfe, who served under General Jeffery Amherst, was shortly promoted to General. He remembered the young private who saved him aboard the Boyne and made him his bodyguard, with orders to remain with him at all times.

The success of the siege cleared the way for the British expedition led by General Wolfe to take New France at Quebec City the following summer and which culminated in the Battle of the Plains of Abraham on September 13, 1759. While it ended with a British victory, Wolfe was fatally shot and Honeyman was among those who carried the General down the heights to his shelter, where he died. Some people believe that one of the three men surrounding Wolfe in the painting La Morte de Wolfe by Benjamin West at the McCord Museum in Montreal is John Honeyman.

After the war, Honeyman was given an honorable discharge from the army and he settled in Pennsylvania, carrying with him his discharge papers as well as a letter from General Wolfe requesting his services as his bodyguard. He took up his trade as a butcher and weaver and he married the former Mary Henry, an Irish woman from Coleraine at the First Presbyterian Church in Philadelphia on September 22, 1764.

== In service as Washington's spy ==
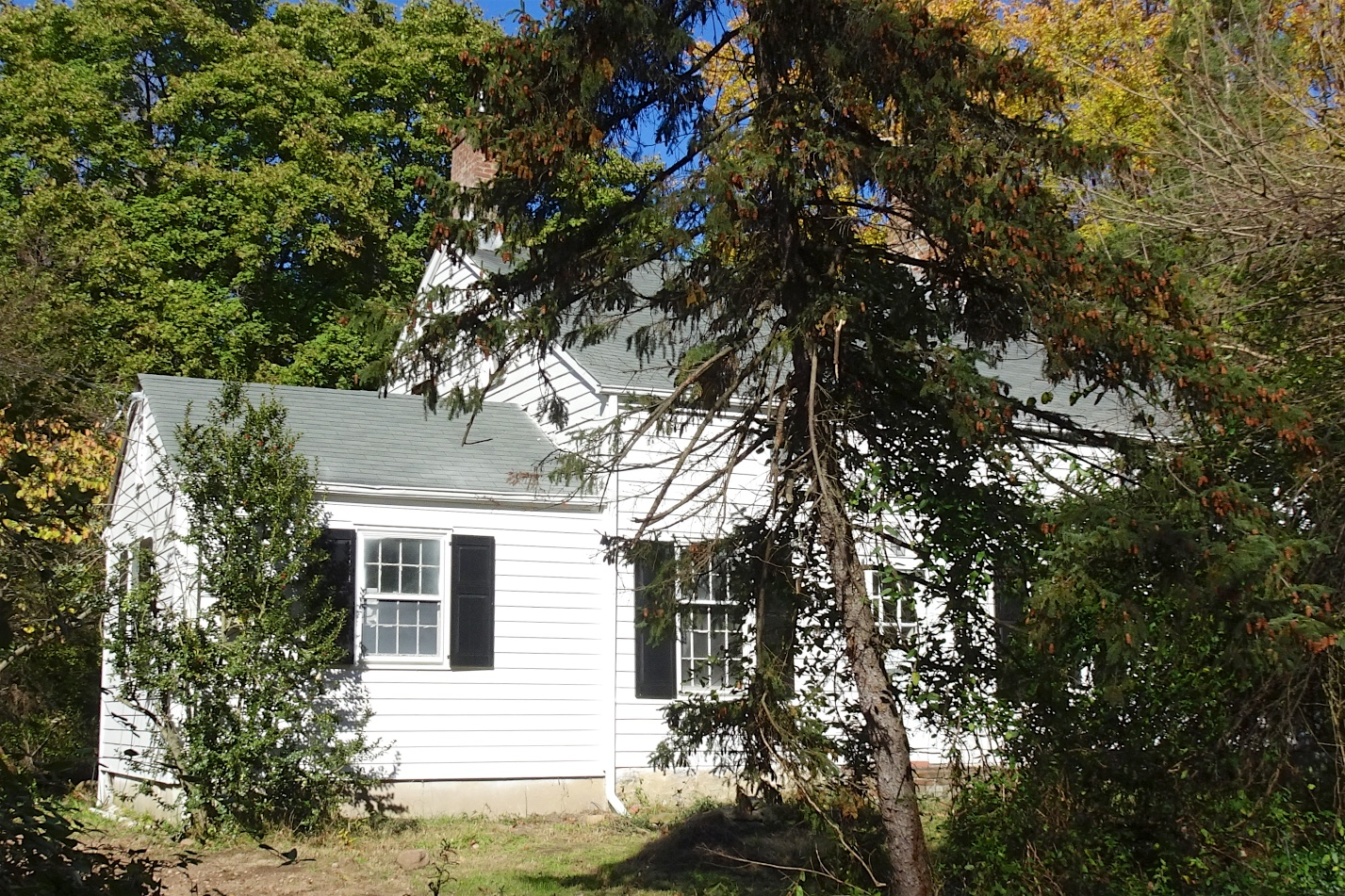
John Honeyman house, Griggstown

Sometime before 1775, Honeyman moved to Philadelphia and supposedly met George Washington who was attending meetings of the Continental Congress. Although Honeyman had served the British well during the French and Indian War, he was sympathetic to the American cause and promptly presented his services to Washington. Washington, astute at finding good talent, accepted Honeyman's services. In the early part of 1776, Honeyman moved with his family to Griggstown, in Somerset County, New Jersey. It is unknown, however, whether this move was a result of his meetings with Washington.

When Washington's Continental Army was retreating across New Jersey in 1776, Washington wanted to "get some person into Trenton" as an agent. He called upon Honeyman for a meeting at Fort Lee, New Jersey, in November and there, Honeyman agreed that he would act the part of a spy for the American cause in that part of New Jersey where he was most familiar. Washington told Honeyman to use the cover of a Tory. The fact that he served under Wolfe, as proven by his discharge papers as well as Wolfe's letter requesting his services as his bodyguard, guaranteed his acceptance by the enemy garrison in Trenton.

Posing as a Tory, Honeyman, continuing his trade as a butcher and weaver, commenced his trade with the British. He was instructed to continue trading as much as possible behind the American lines in Griggstown and, if necessary, to flee to Trenton on the pretext of the danger posed to his family due to his double-dealing. The deceptive plan was so believable that a mob of angry American patriots raided Honeyman's house in Griggstown. Fortunately, his family were saved from certain harm by a signed letter from Washington guaranteeing its safety, but nevertheless calling Honeyman "a notorious Tory".

His credibility as a Tory now well-established, he moved to Trenton where his trade enabled him to move freely within the town and gather intelligence about the garrison. Having amassed enough information, he arranged to be captured by the Continental forces, who had been ordered to watch for him and bring him straight to Washington unharmed.

After receiving the information Honeyman had gathered, Washington ordered the guards to feed the "Tory" and lock him up in a small hut used as a prison. Shortly afterward, a fire broke out in the vicinity providing an opportunity for Honeyman to "escape". Making his way back to Trenton, he told the Hessian commander, Colonel Johann Rall, of his capture and reported that the Continental Army was in such a low state of morale that they would not attack Trenton.

Even though the Hessians had been on heightened alert for the past two weeks, they believed Honeyman's story and so felt confident enough to relax security on December 26. In the meantime, Honeyman made his way to New Brunswick, New Jersey.

On the night of December 25–26, 1776, with 2,400 troops, Washington made the well known crossing of the Delaware River from Pennsylvania to New Jersey north of Trenton. The next morning, the Continental forces surprised the Hessians in a rout, giving the Americans a much-needed victory at the Battle of Trenton.

With Washington, Honeyman had arranged for his mission to be confined in New Jersey and since the British were driven from the colony in 1777 his services were little needed, if at all. It had further been agreed upon, however, that Honeyman would continue to maintain his cover as a Tory to prevent any reprisals by the British against him and his family until the end of the war. As a consequence, he did not return to Griggstown until after hostilities ended four years later.

== Later years ==
By 1793, Honeyman moved to Bedminster, New Jersey, in upper Somerset County. He bought several parcels of land between 1793 and 1797 and spent the last 30 years of his life there.

His wife, Mary Honeyman, died on June 24, 1801, and three years later, he married a widow, Elizabeth Estel-Burrows. He died on August 18, 1822, at the age of 93 and is buried in the Lamington Presbyterian Church Cemetery in Lamington, New Jersey.

== Fact or legend debate ==
The role Honeyman played in the Revolutionary War has been debated for some time. The first written record of his involvement with Washington appears to be his grandson Judge John Van Dyke's "An Unwritten Account of a Spy of Washington," which appeared in Our Home magazine in 1873, nearly 100 years later. Van Dyke is said to have relied on details he got from one of Honeyman's daughters, Van Dyke's Aunt Jane Honeyman who died in 1836. Judge Van Dyke's son, John Charles Van Dyke, the author of The Desert, added that "documents discovered in the Secretary of State's office at Trenton go to confirm it," without identifying the documents further. In his autobiography, John C. Van Dyke also wrote, "My father was much with him (Honeyman) in his later years, and he had fragments of the story from the spy's own lips, but the spy was never very communicative."

Doubters point to the lack of direct evidence to support the spy story, including the fact that the letter from Washington that protected the Honeyman family has never been seen outside the family. Some find it odd that a document of such apparent historic value has never surfaced publicly. Author Alexander Rose notes that "not once is John Honeyman mentioned in Washington's voluminous correspondence and papers" and that "upon meeting Honeyman, a veteran of the British army, Washington would have been more likely to recruit him as a sergeant than as a spy."

Supporters argue that the lack of direct evidence merely points to the excellent job Honeyman, and Washington, did concealing his actions as a spy. Some have offered circumstantial evidence to support the spy story. Historians have pointed out that several legal actions brought against Honeyman for being a Tory appear to have been dismissed. Honeyman even sought compensation for losses he suffered during the war, something that a Tory would not have considered. While other Tories were forced to flee to Nova Scotia after the war, Honeyman remained in New Jersey. In fact, it is known that Honeyman purchased several tracts of land after the war, which raises the question of how a simple weaver with a rather large family could afford to make these purchases without some special income. John C. Van Dyke records that Honeyman "had always been considered a poor man, and his neighbors were much surprised when he died leaving about twelve thousand dollars. That was a large sum in those days...." That is evidence, to some, that he received compensation for his role in the war.

== See also ==
- Intelligence in the American Revolutionary War
