= John Mott (captain) =

Captain (1734–1804)

- Born: June 18, 1734; Middletown Township, New Jersey, British America
- Died: January 31, 1804 (aged 69)
- Burial place: Trenton, New Jersey, U.S.
- Relatives: Gersham Mott (Son) and William Mott (Son)
- Military career
- Allegiance: United States
- Branch: Militia
- Rank: Captain
- Unit: 1st Hunterdon Militia Regiment
- Commands: Company
- Conflicts: Battle of Trenton; Battle of Somerset Court House; Battle of Short Hills; Battle of Monmouth; Battle of Springfield
- Other work: Justice of the Peace, Hunterdon County

John Mott (June 18, 1734 – January 31, 1804) was a captain in the 1st Hunterdon Regiment of the New Jersey militia during the American Revolutionary War. He served as a guide to General George Washington and the Continental Army during their march down along the Delaware River prior to the Battle of Trenton.

== Early life ==
Captain Mott was born in Middletown Township Province of New Jersey. He was the son of William Mott of Middletown and Margaret Hartshorne. His father was a member of the New Jersey State Assembly from 1743 to 1754. John Mott had two brothers, Gershom and Asher, and a sister, Sarah. John Mott moved to the Trenton area and purchased two flour or grist mills located along the River Road several miles north of Trenton. He lived near his mills and was a neighbor of General Philemon Dickinson, a militia officer. David Laning, another guide at the Battle of Trenton, was a cooper who lived nearby and worked at one of Mott's mills. In March 1776, John Mott, along with other members of the New Jersey militia, were on the Committee of Correspondence for Trenton.

== Early Revolutionary War ==
During the Revolutionary War, John Mott was a member of the 1st Regiment of the Hunterdon County Militia, which was under the command of Colonel Isaac Smith. In June 1776, two companies of the 1st Hunterdon Militia were detached to become part of General Nathaniel Heard's Brigade. John Mott replaced Robert Hoops as a Captain of one of the companies that remained under Col. Isaac Smith in General Philemon Dickinson's Brigade. Captain Mott's company was at Perth Amboy, New Jersey in July 1776 when the Declaration of Independence was read to the militia. Mott and his militia company participated in several skirmishes around the Perth Amboy and Elizabethtown area throughout the summer and early fall of 1776. This included a raid on Staten Island led by Adjutant Elias Phillips (a guide at the Battle of Trenton) that resulted in several British prisoners being captured.

== Battle of Trenton ==
The companies in General Dickinson's Brigade were divided into two divisions that served on alternating one month tours of duty. The 1st Hunterdon Militia Regiment was one of the few regiments of the New Jersey Militia to turn out and serve all of their tours of duty throughout the summer and fall of 1776. On December 1, 1776, their service expired. Soon afterwards, both divisions of the 1st Hunterdon, including Captain Mott and his company, were called out to serve as volunteers.

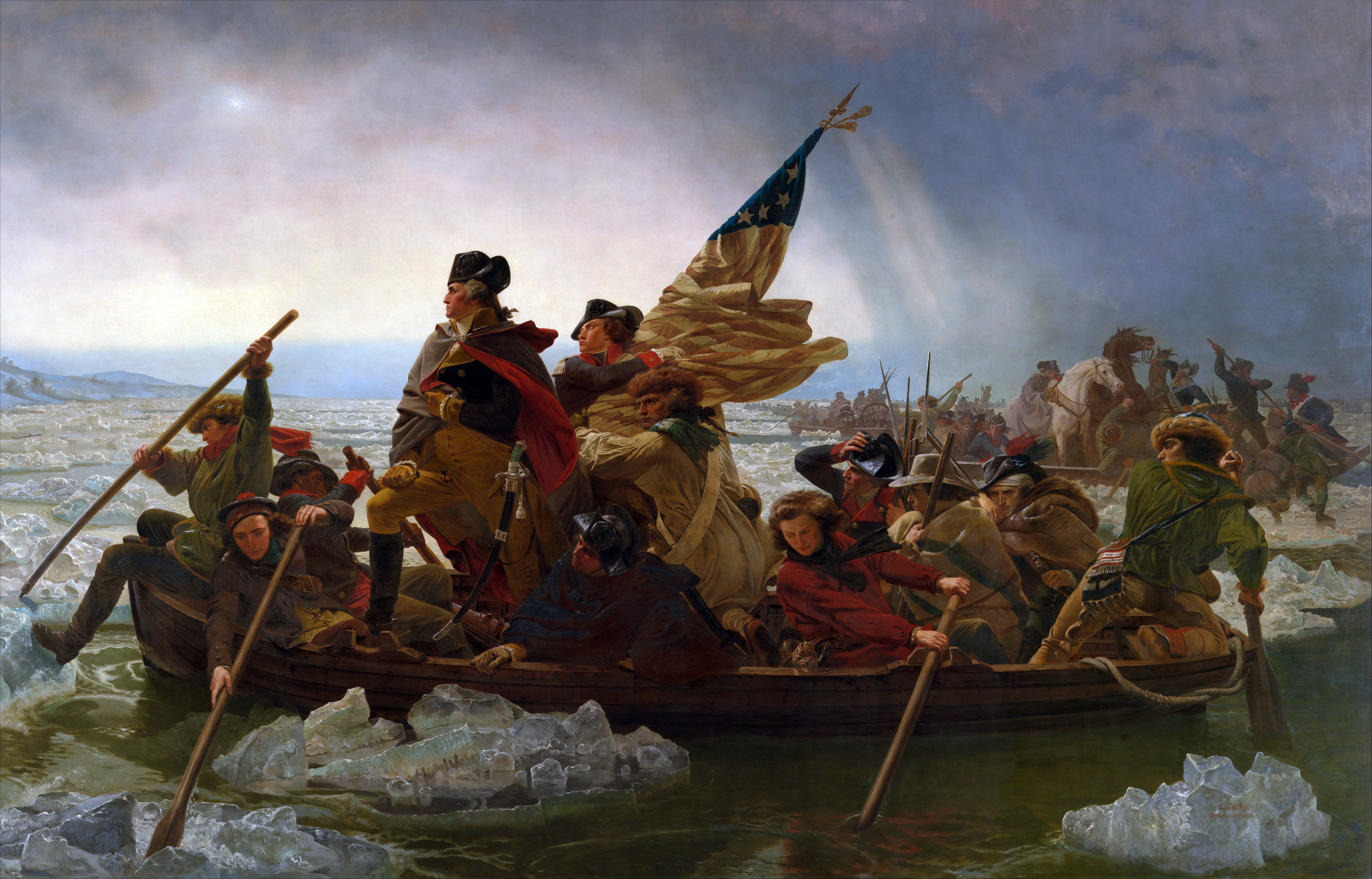
Washington Crossing the Delaware

They crossed the Delaware River during the first week of December 1776 and were stationed in Yardley, Pennsylvania. Their militia regiment was commanded by Col. Isaac Smith and Lt. Col. Joseph Phillips. General Philemon Dickinson also had his headquarters at Yardley, Pennsylvania. Some of the men in the 1st Hunterdon Militia made excursions across the Delaware River over the next few weeks to obtain intelligence on the British and Hessian soldiers due to their knowledge of the local area. On one of these excursions, Adjutant Elias Phillips captured three British soldiers in his deserted hometown of Maidenhead (now Lawrenceville). On another excursion, David Laning was caught by the British and taken to Trenton on around December 20, 1776. He escaped the next day and brought back valuable information.

General Philemon Dickinson sent a letter to General George Washington on December 24, 1776 which was carried by Capt. John Mott to introduce Mott and offer his service and that of his men as guides. All of the guides except two were in the 1st Hunterdon Militia and all except one lived in Hunterdon County, New Jersey. The guides included Col. Joseph Phillips, Capt. Philip Phillips, and Adjutant Elias Phillips, of Maidenhead; John Muirheid, Joseph Inslee, Eden Burroughs, Stephen Burroughs, Ephraim Woolsey, and Henry Simmons, of Hopewell; and Capt. John Mott, David Laning, Amos Scudder, and William Green, of Trenton. John Guild of Hopewell and James Slack of Bucks County, PA were the other two guides. Henry Simmons, Stephen Burrows, Ephraim Woolsey, Uriah Slack, David Laning, William Green, and Amos Scudder were all under Capt. John Mott.

Capt. Mott and the other guides rendezvoused with General Washington's troops at McConkey's Ferry on December 25, 1776 and crossed the Delaware River. General Washington's plan called for two guides to accompany each brigade. When the army divided at Birmingham, David Laning, John Muirheid, and John Guild rode in front of the army down the Scotch and Pennington Roads with General Washington and General Green's Division. Capt. John Mott served as guide to General John Sullivan's Division down the River Road.

After the split of the two divisions of the army, Capt. Mott discovered that his priming powder was wet. He was then sent by Gen. Sullivan to ask Gen. Washington for orders since none of the rifles would be capable of being fired. Gen. Washington's emphatic reply was to "tell the General to use the bayonet and penetrate into the town; for the town must be taken and I am resolved to take it". Capt. Mott then continued to guide Gen. Sullivan's Division down the River Road passing his own house and mills as well as passing Gen. Dickinson's house where some Hessian Jäger were posted. Both divisions of the army attacked the Hessian outposts on the River Road and Pennington Road simultaneously at 8 a.m. after their four-hour march. They then continued into Trenton where the battle continued for over an hour. After the Battle of Trenton, Gen. Washington's army returned to Johnson's Ferry by the River Road along with their Hessian prisoners.

== Remainder of the Revolutionary War ==
Capt. John Mott's company may have been involved in the Second Battle of Trenton, but it is not clear. It is possible that he and his men were at the battle and remained at Trenton (due to their knowledge of the area), allowing Gen. Washington and the army to march towards Princeton, New Jersey. Capt Mott's company may have then crossed back over the Delaware River. His company was apparently not at the Battle of Princeton since they were on the Pennsylvania side of the Delaware River guarding the baggage wagons and supplies. As part of the foraging war in early 1777, Capt. Mott and his company were in the 1st Hunterdon Regiment under Col. Joseph Phillips. They helped Gen. Dickinson harass the British coming out of New Brunswick, New Jersey foraging for food and supplies.

Capt. Mott's company also participated in the Battle of Somerset Court House in January 1777 and the Battle of Short Hills in June 1777. When the Continental Army left New Jersey in the fall, Capt. Mott's company remained in New Jersey with the rest of the New Jersey militia to help protect that side of the Delaware River.

John Mott became a Justice of the Peace for Hunterdon County in September 1777. For a week in early June 1778, Capt. Mott's company provided bodyguard protection for Gen. Dickinson. They then participated with the General and the rest of his New Jersey militia in harassing the British, who were crossing New Jersey after their evacuation of Philadelphia. This included skirmishes at Crosswicks and Englishtown.

Mott's company participated in the Battle of Monmouth in June 1778 and the Battle of Springfield in June 1780. In March 1781, Capt. Mott was on the Board of Court Martial of Lt. Col. William Chamberlain along with Col. Joseph Phillips, who was president of the board. In June 1781, Capt. Mott became a recruiting officer for Hunterdon County.

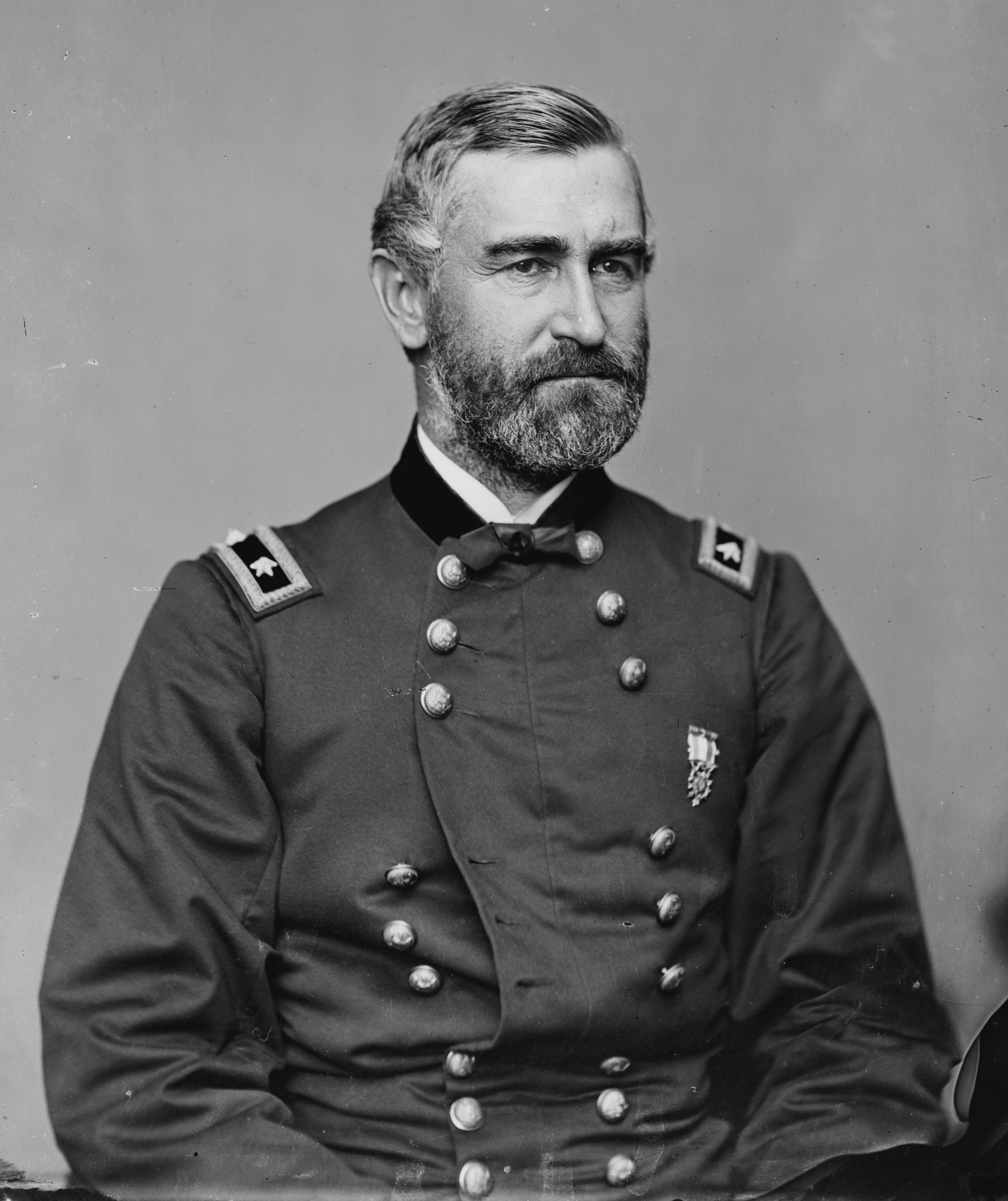
Gersham Mott, John Mott's grandson

== After the war ==
John Mott became a Justice of the Peace for Hunterdon County, New Jersey again in June 1782. He married Eleanor Johnson Alexander, the widow of Continental Navy Captain Charles Alexander, on June 7, 1784. Mott and his wife had two sons, Gershom (born 1785) and William (born 1790). Gershom Mott married Phebe Rose Scudder, the granddaughter of guide Amos Scudder, and was the father of Union Civil War General Gershom Mott. John Mott and his wife, Eleanor, joined the Quakers in Trenton after the war, as did Gen. Philemon Dickinson and his wife. All four were buried in the Quaker burial ground in Trenton.
