= Lamington Historic District =

Historic district in New Jersey, United States

- U.S. National Register of Historic Places
- U.S. Historic district
- New Jersey Register of Historic Places
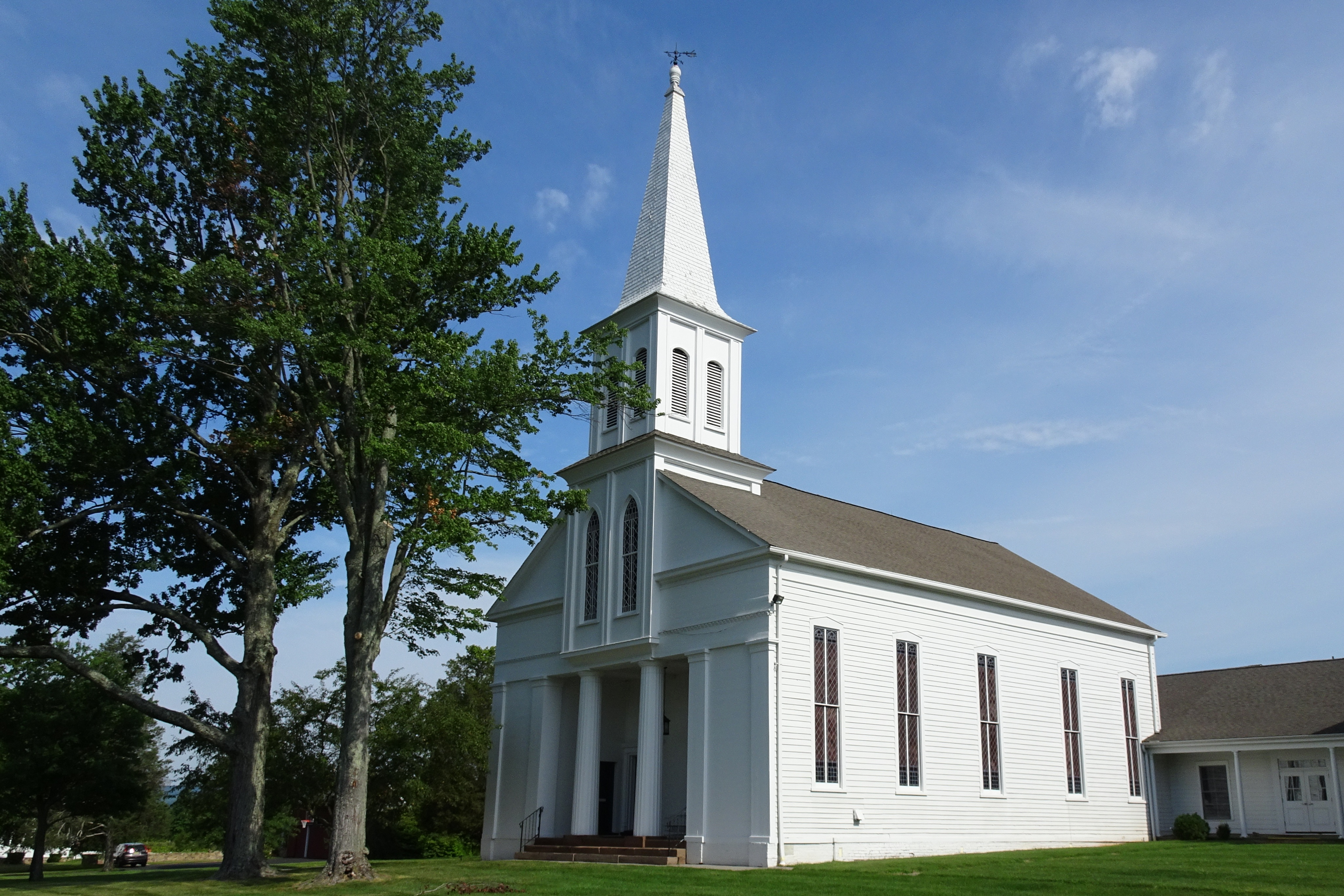
- Lamington Presbyterian Church

- Location within Somerset County, New Jersey Location within New Jersey Location within the United States
- Location: Lamington, Black River, Rattlesnake Bridge, and Cowperthwaite Roads, Lamington, New Jersey
- Coordinates: 40°39′38″N 74°43′03″W
- Area: 84 acres (34 ha)
- Architectural style: Greek Revival, Queen Anne
- NRHP reference No.: 84002802
- NJRHP No.: 2461

Significant dates
- Added to NRHP: June 21, 1984
- Designated NJRHP: May 7, 1984

The Lamington Historic District is an 84-acre (34 ha) historic district located along Lamington, Black River, Rattlesnake Bridge, and Cowperthwaite Roads in the Lamington section of Bedminster Township in Somerset County, New Jersey. It was added to the National Register of Historic Places on June 21, 1984, for its significance in architecture, exploration/settlement, and religion. The district includes 11 contributing buildings and 3 contributing sites.

== History and description ==
The Lamington Presbyterian Church was built in 1826, replacing the original one built in 1740. A steeple and portico were added 1854. The church was moved and refurbished in 1885. It features Greek Revival architecture. The Lamington Presbyterian Church Cemetery has a historic section with the graves of several American Revolutionary War veterans, including John Honeyman and James Linn. The earliest known burial is dated 1740. The Ten Eyck House was built about 1890 and features vernacular Queen Anne style. The Lamington Black Cemetery was established in 1857. The schoolhouse was built in 1915 and was bought by the Lamington Presbyterian Church in 1963.

== Gallery of contributing properties ==
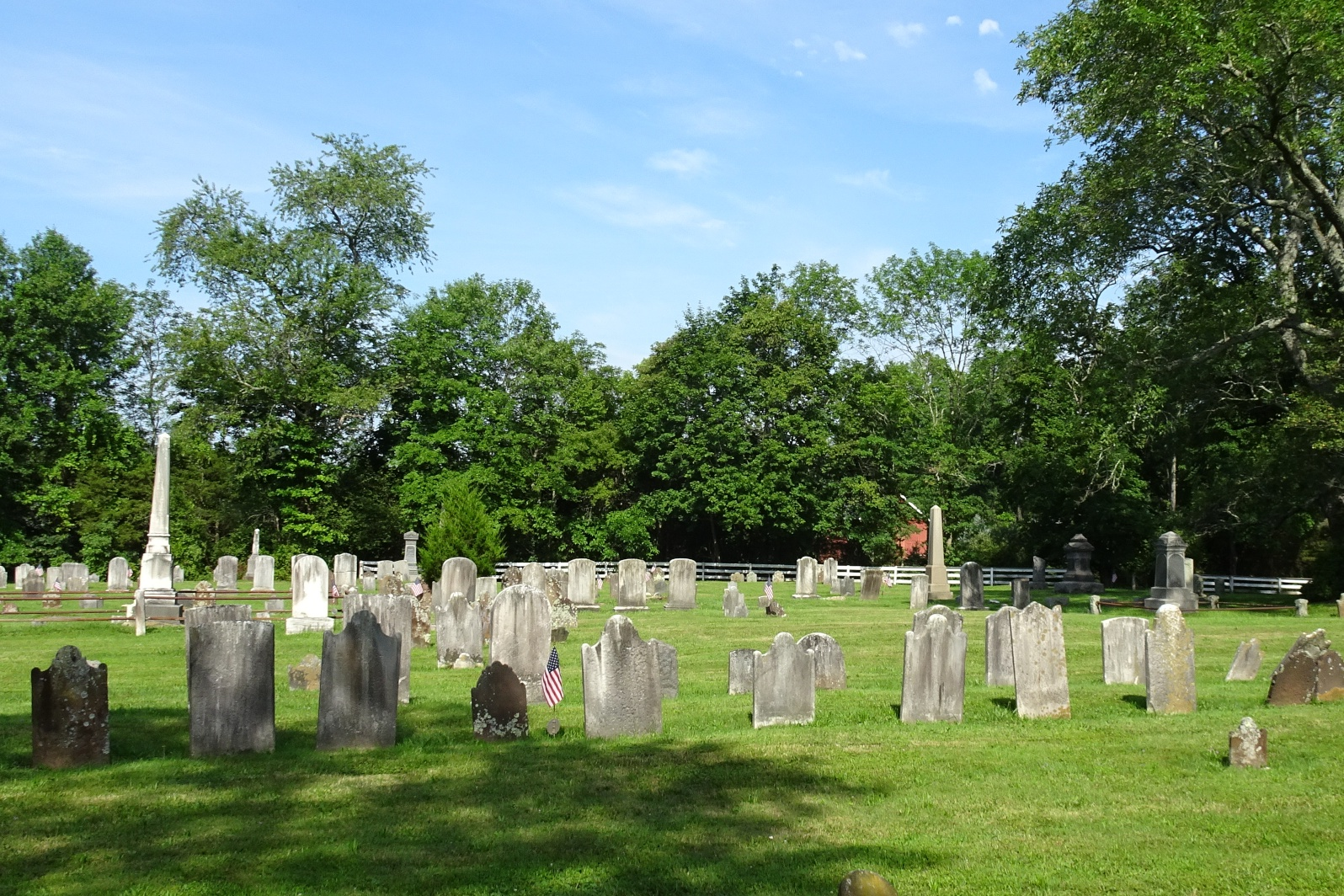
Lamington Presbyterian Church Cemetery

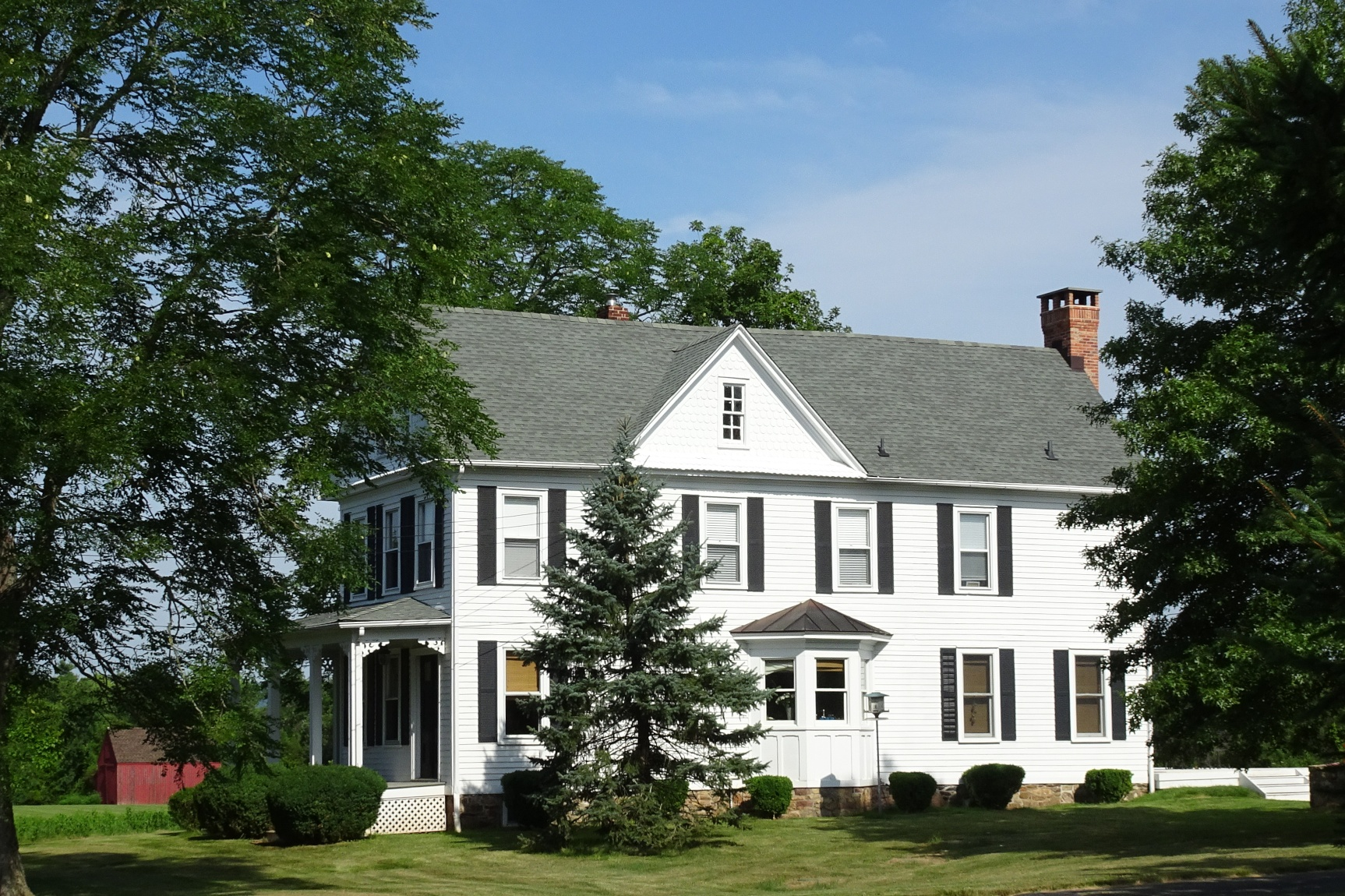
Ten Eyck House

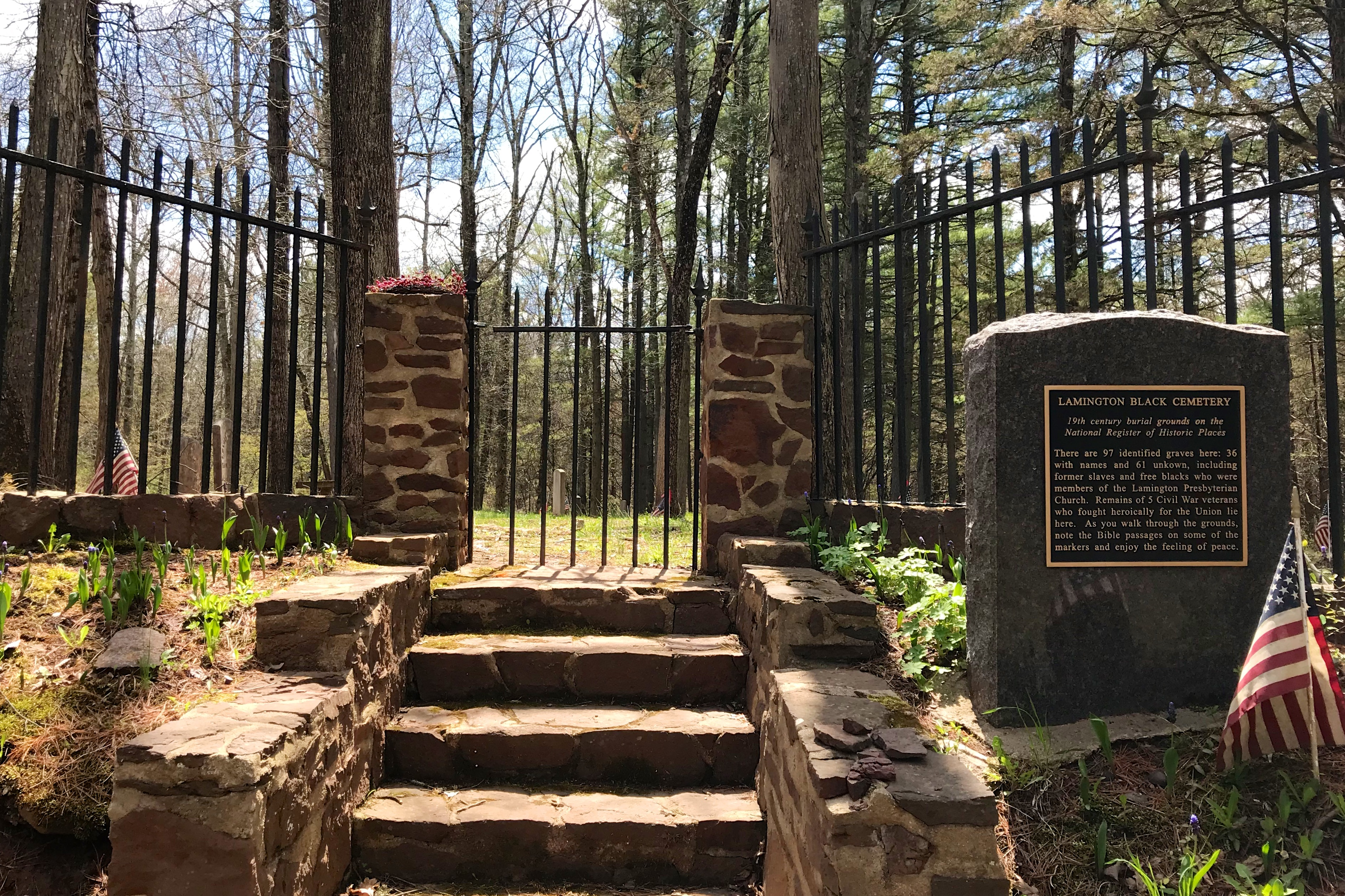
Lamington Black Cemetery

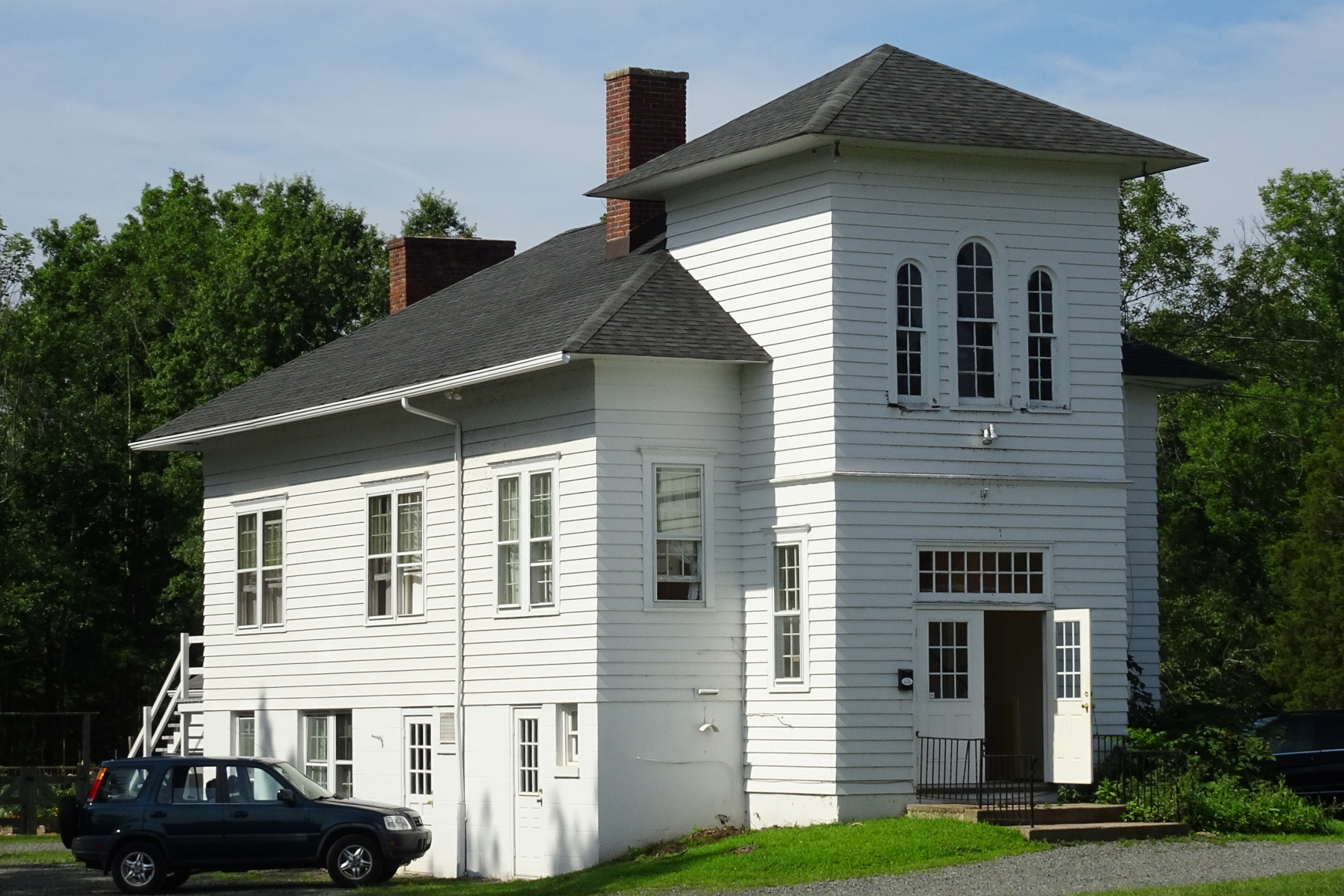
Schoolhouse

== See also ==
- National Register of Historic Places listings in Somerset County, New Jersey
