= Lamington, New Jersey =

Populated place in Somerset County, New Jersey, US

- Census-designated place
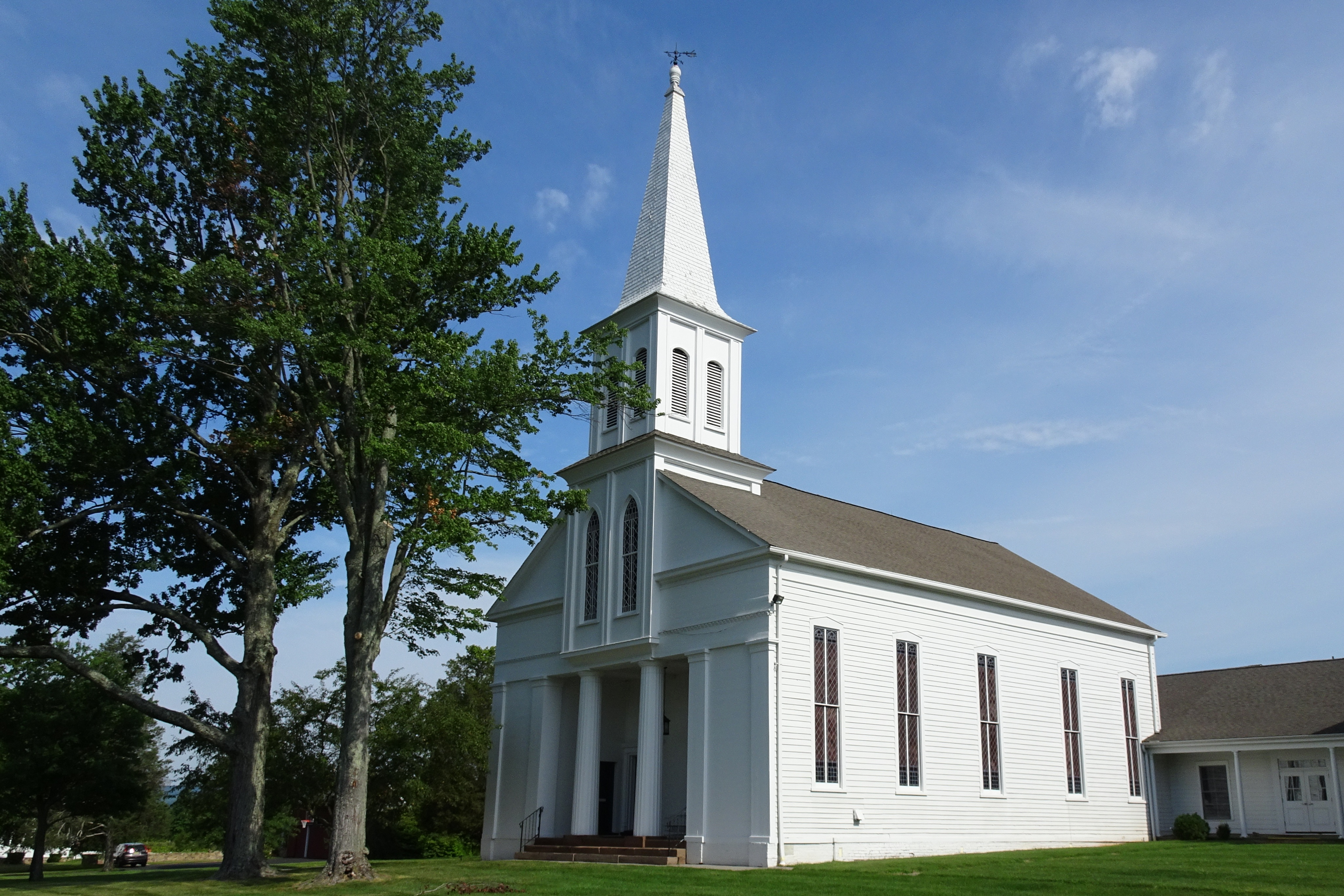
- Lamington Presbyterian Church

- Location in Somerset County Location in New Jersey Location in the United States
- Coordinates: 40°39′39″N 74°43′03″W
- Country: United States
- State: New Jersey
- County: Somerset
- Township: Bedminster

Area
  - Total: 4.36 sq mi (11.30 km^{2})
  - Land: 4.32 sq mi (11.20 km^{2})
  - Water: 0.035 sq mi (0.09 km^{2})

Population (2020)
  - Total: 135
  - Density: 31.2/sq mi (12.05/km^{2})
- Time zone: UTC−05:00 (Eastern (EST))
  - Summer (DST): UTC−04:00 (Eastern (EDT))
- FIPS code: 34-38670
- GNIS feature ID: 877657; 2806111

Lamington is an unincorporated community and census-designated place (CDP) located within Bedminster Township in Somerset County, in the U.S. state of New Jersey. As of the 2020 census, Lamington had a population of 135. It contains the Lamington Presbyterian Church Cemetery and the Lamington Black Cemetery.

== Demographics ==
Historical population
Census	Pop.	Note	%±
2020	135		—
U.S. Decennial Census; 2020

Lamington first appeared as a census-designated place in the 2020 U.S. census.

Lamington CDP, New Jersey – Racial and ethnic composition Note: the US Census treats Hispanic/Latino as an ethnic category. This table excludes Latinos from the racial categories and assigns them to a separate category. Hispanics/Latinos may be of any race.
Race / Ethnicity (NH = Non-Hispanic)	Pop 2020	2020
White alone (NH)	98	72.59%
Black or African American alone (NH)	3	2.22%
Native American or Alaska Native alone (NH)	0	0.00%
Asian alone (NH)	11	8.15%
Native Hawaiian or Pacific Islander alone (NH)	0	0.00%
Other race alone (NH)	0	0.00%
Mixed race or Multiracial (NH)	3	2.22%
Hispanic or Latino (any race)	20	14.81%
Total	135	100.00%

As of 2020, the population was 135.

== The name ==
"Lamington" is a corruption of the Native American word for the nearby stream, the "Allemetunck" or the "Loamatong". Its name means "the place within the hills" or "the place of paint clay." There are 113 recorded variations on the spelling of Lamington, including "Alamatunk," "Lametunk" and "Lamberton."

== The church ==
The Lamington Presbyterian Church was constructed in 1826, replacing the original built in 1740. Church membership included Scots-Irish Presbyterians, Dutch and German settlers, tenant-farmers, large and small landowners, lawyers, teachers, millers, weavers, tailors, other craftsmen and workmen, slaves and freed blacks.

== National Register of Historic Places ==
The Lamington Historic District, which includes the Presbyterian Church and the Lamington Black Cemetery, was added to the National Register of Historic Places in 1984.

== Notable people ==
People who were born in, residents of, or otherwise closely associated with Lamington include:

- Joseph Caldwell (1773–1835), first President of the University of North Carolina at Chapel Hill.
- John Honeyman (1729–1822), alleged "spy of Washington" during the American Revolutionary War lived the last 30 years of his life in the Lamington area and is buried in the Lamington Presbyterian Church Cemetery (his original gravestone, as well as a document showing his assigned church pew, is exhibited inside the church building).
- Zebulon Pike (1779–1813), brigadier general and early explorer who was the namesake for Pikes Peak, though the explorer is often erroneously said to have been born in Lamberton, a port community that has since been annexed by Trenton in Mercer County.
- Jane McCrea (c. 1752–1777), colonist killed by a Huron-Wendat warrior associated with the British army, whose slaying led to outrage and an increase in Patriot military support.
- John Van Dyke (1807–1878), represented New Jersey's 4th congressional district in the United States House of Representatives from 1847 to 1851.

Notable burials:

- James Linn (1749–1821), a United States Representative from New Jersey who was a member of the Provincial Congress of New Jersey in 1776, served in the Somerset County Militia during the Revolutionary War and is buried in the Lamington Presbyterian Church Cemetery.
