= Lamington Black Cemetery =

Historic cemetery in Somerset County, New Jersey, US

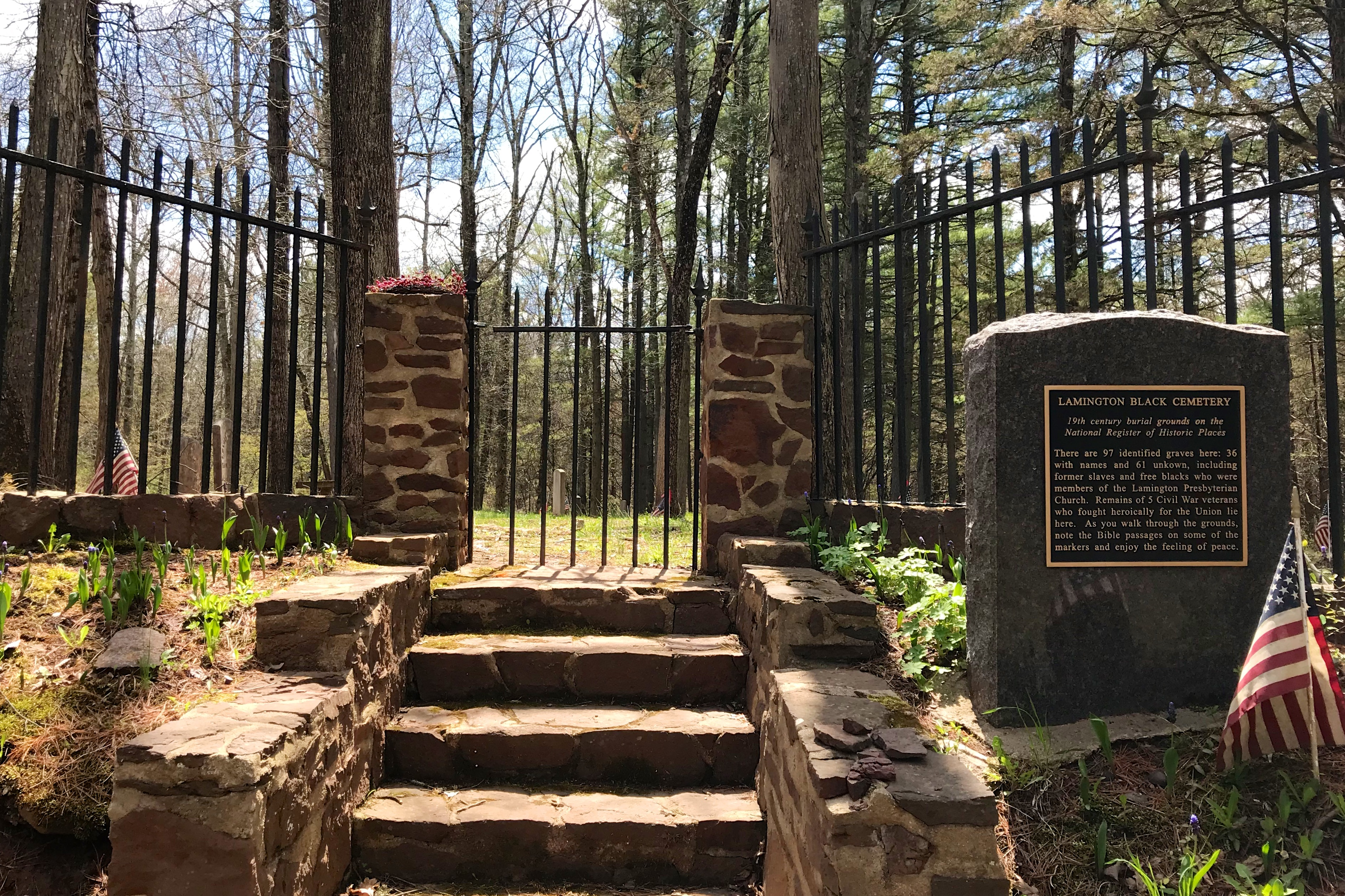
- Entrance gate, in 2018
- Interactive map of Lamington Black Cemetery

Details
- Location: Cowperthwaite Road, Lamington, New Jersey
- Coordinates: 40°39′28″N 74°42′32″W
- Find a Grave: Lamington Black Cemetery
- Lamington Black Cemetery
- U.S. Historic district – Contributing property
- Location within Somerset County, New Jersey Location within New Jersey Location within the United States
- Part of: Lamington Historic District (ID84002802)
- Designated CP: June 21, 1984

The Lamington Black Cemetery is an African American cemetery in the Lamington section of Bedminster Township, New Jersey, located on Cowperthwaite Road. It is also known as the Cowperthwaite African American Cemetery. The cemetery is a contributing property of the Lamington Historic District, which was listed on the National Register of Historic Places on June 21, 1984.

== History ==
The cemetery was established in 1857, although the earliest burial was in 1848 (Samuel Lane) and burials of enslaved people may have taken place before 1844. Of the 97 known graves, 37 of marked, many with plain fieldstone markers with no inscriptions. Two veterans of the US Colored Troops are among those interred here.

== Gallery ==
Plaque at the entrance

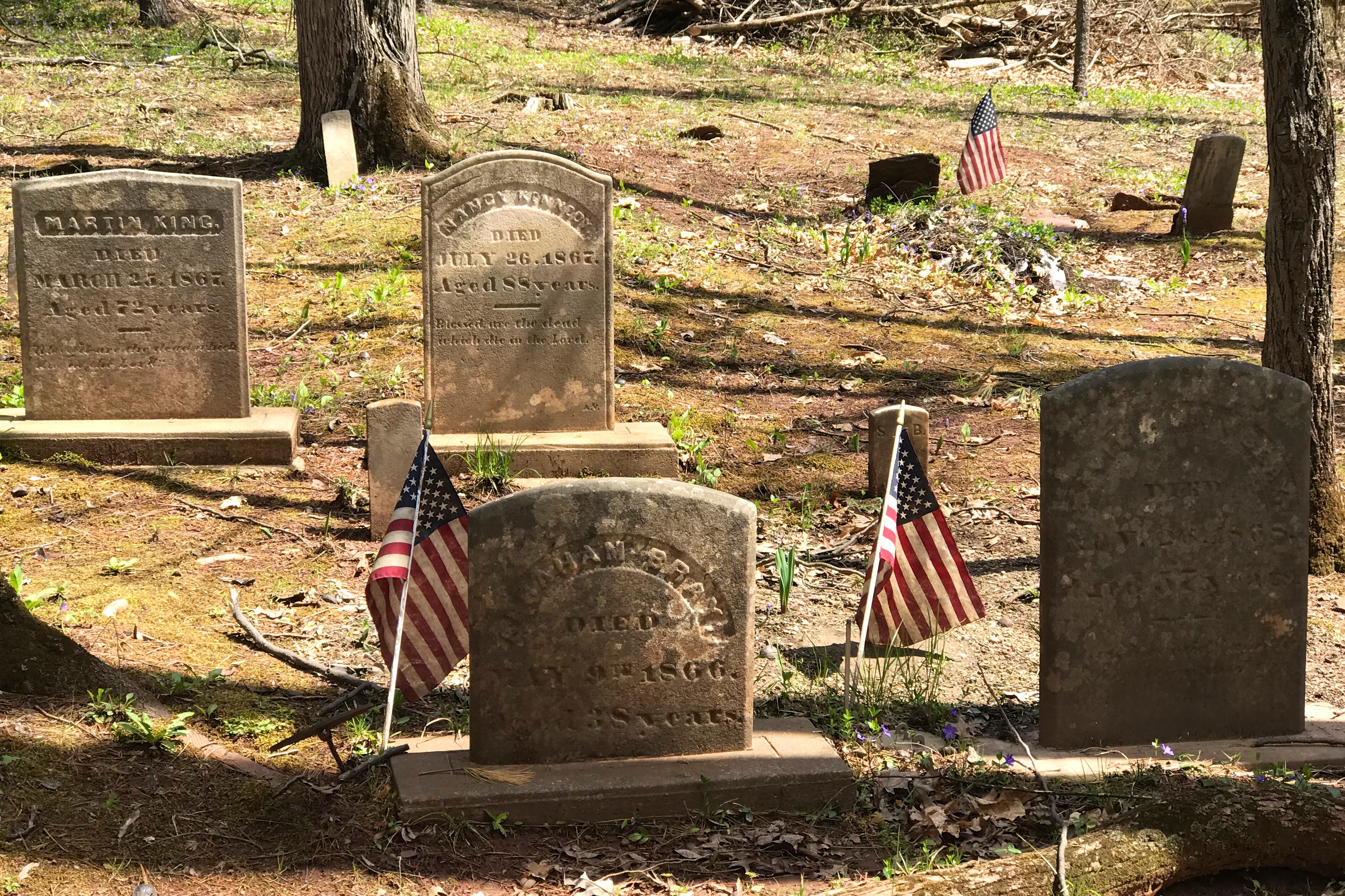
Graves in the cemetery

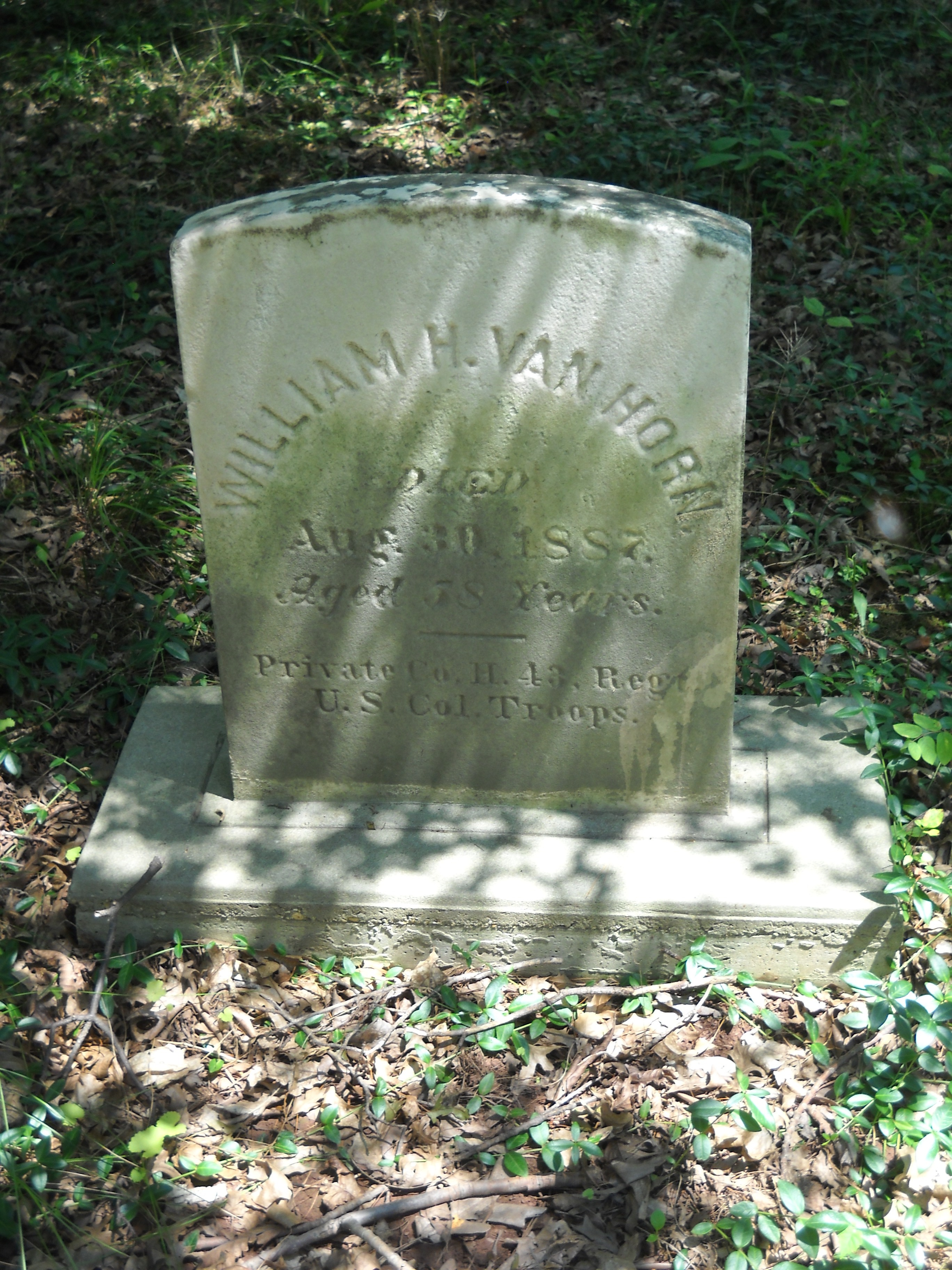
William H. Van Horn, Private, Company H, 43rd Regiment, U.S. Colored Troops
