= Lamberton, New Jersey =

Populated place in Camden County, New Jersey, US

- Unincorporated community
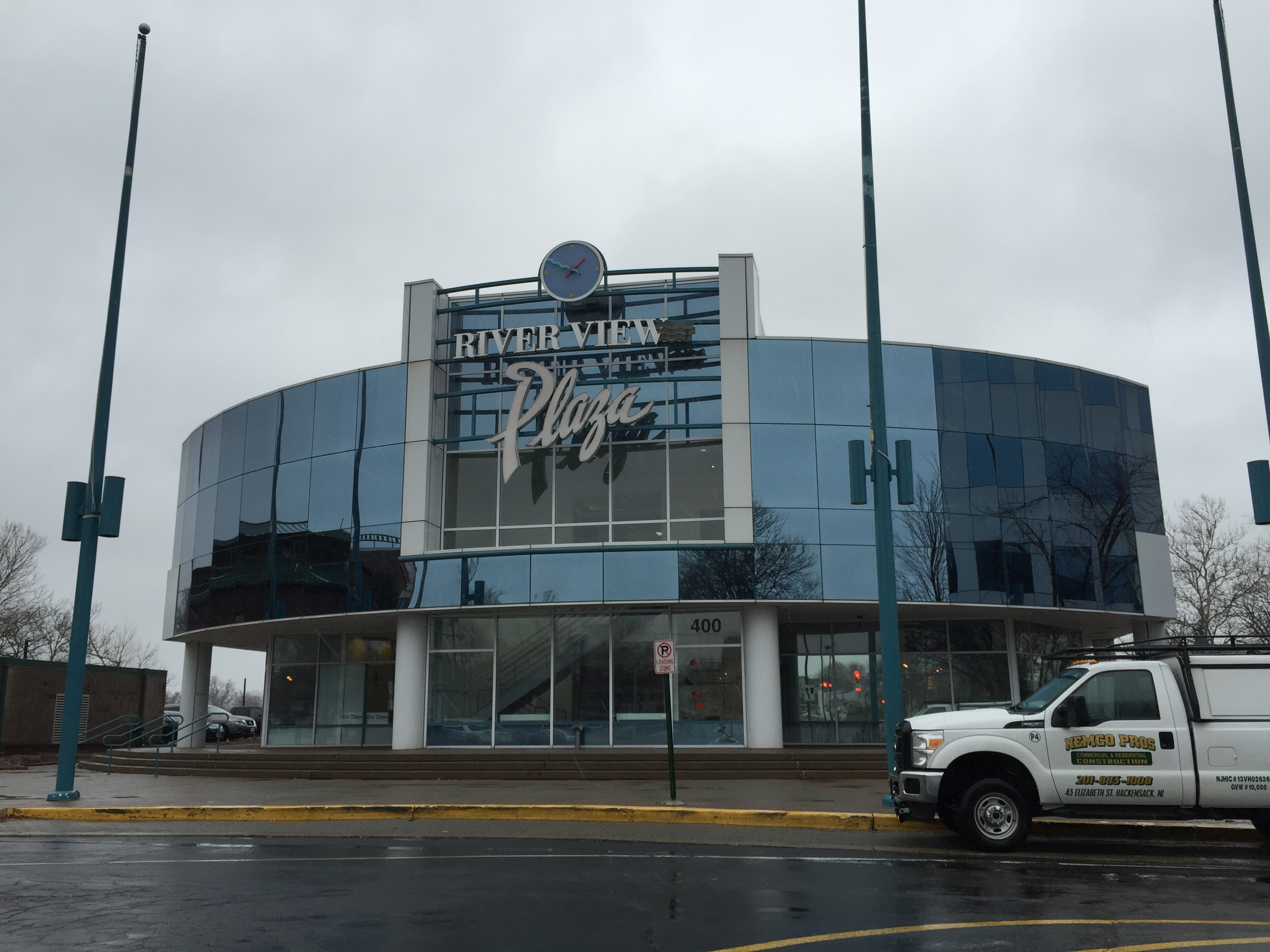
- Riverview Plaza on the Trenton Waterfront

- Location of Lamberton in Mercer County Inset: Location of county within the state of New Jersey Lamberton (New Jersey) Lamberton (the United States)
- Coordinates: 40°11′59″N 74°45′32″W
- Country: United States
- State: New Jersey
- County: Mercer
- City: Trenton

Lamberton was the name of a port community on the Delaware River in Mercer County, in the U.S. state of New Jersey. It was annexed by the city of Trenton as part of South Trenton in 1856. It is now known simply as Waterfront.

Lamberton is often incorrectly attributed as the birthplace of Zebulon Pike, for whom Pikes Peak (in Colorado) was named, though the explorer was born in another Lamberton, now known as Lamington, in Bedminster Township in Somerset County.
