= Bridgewater Center, New Jersey =

Populated place in Somerset County, New Jersey, US

- Census-designated place
- Location in Somerset County Location in New Jersey Location in the United States
- Coordinates: 40°35′49″N 74°38′29″W
- Country: United States
- State: New Jersey
- County: Somerset
- Township: Bridgewater

Area
  - Total: 5.85 sq mi (15.16 km^{2})
  - Land: 5.83 sq mi (15.11 km^{2})
  - Water: 0.019 sq mi (0.05 km^{2})
- Elevation: 110 ft (34 m)

Population (2020)
  - Total: 6,082
  - Density: 1,042.6/sq mi (402.56/km^{2})
- Time zone: UTC−05:00 (Eastern (EST))
  - Summer (DST): UTC−04:00 (EDT)
- ZIP Codes: 08807 (Bridgewater)
- Area code: 908
- FIPS code: 34-07728
- GNIS feature ID: 2806057

Bridgewater Center is a census-designated place (CDP) located in the west-central part of Bridgewater Township, Somerset County, in the U.S. state of New Jersey. It was first listed as a CDP prior to the 2020 census with a population of 4,616.

Within Bridgewater Township, the community is bordered to the northeast by Green Knoll and to the southwest by Bradley Gardens. To the south it is bordered by the boroughs of Raritan and Somerville. It is bordered to the northwest by Bedminster Township and to the west by Branchburg Township.

Interstate 287 forms the northeast border of the CDP, separating it from Green Knoll, while U.S. Route 22 forms the southern border with Somerville. Farther to the west, Route 28 (Easton Turnpike) forms the CDP's border with Raritan and Bradley Gardens.

== Demographics ==
Historical population
Census	Pop.	Note	%±
2020	6,082		—
U.S. Decennial Census; 2020

Bridgewater Center first appeared as a census designated place in the 2020 U.S. census.

=== 2020 census ===
As of the 2020 census, Bridgewater Center had a population of 6,082. The median age was 44.9 years. 23.0% of residents were under the age of 18 and 18.1% of residents were 65 years of age or older. For every 100 females there were 97.6 males, and for every 100 females age 18 and over there were 96.7 males age 18 and over.

100.0% of residents lived in urban areas, while 0.0% lived in rural areas.

There were 1,952 households in Bridgewater Center, of which 39.7% had children under the age of 18 living in them. Of all households, 75.4% were married-couple households, 7.9% were households with a male householder and no spouse or partner present, and 14.3% were households with a female householder and no spouse or partner present. About 12.4% of all households were made up of individuals and 8.2% had someone living alone who was 65 years of age or older.

There were 2,049 housing units, of which 4.7% were vacant. The homeowner vacancy rate was 0.6% and the rental vacancy rate was 33.3%.

Bridgewater Center CDP, New Jersey – Racial and ethnic composition Note: the US Census treats Hispanic/Latino as an ethnic category. This table excludes Latinos from the racial categories and assigns them to a separate category. Hispanics/Latinos may be of any race.
Race / Ethnicity (NH = Non-Hispanic)	Pop 2020	% 2020
White alone (NH)	4,616	75.90%
Black or African American alone (NH)	112	1.84%
Native American or Alaska Native alone (NH)	5	0.08%
Asian alone (NH)	731	12.02%
Native Hawaiian or Pacific Islander alone (NH)	1	0.02%
Other race alone (NH)	20	0.33%
Mixed race or Multiracial (NH)	208	3.42%
Hispanic or Latino (any race)	389	6.40%
Total	6,082	100.00%
