= Sri Venkateswara Temple (New Jersey) =

Hindu temple in New Jersey

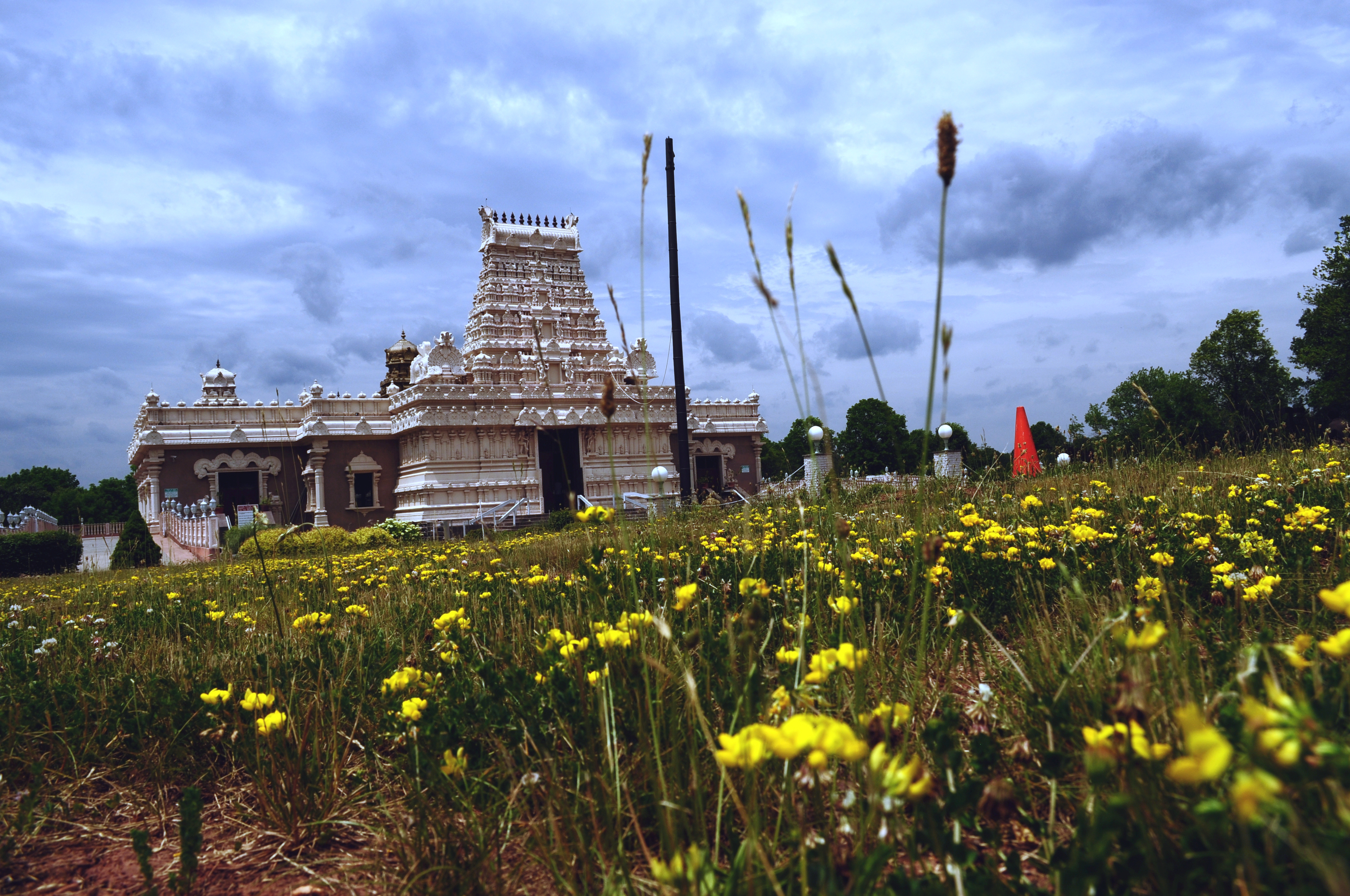

- Location within New Jersey

Religion
- Affiliation: Hinduism
- Deity: Venkateswara

Location
- Location: 1 Balaji Temple Drive, Bridgewater, New Jersey 08807
- State: New Jersey
- Country: United States
- Coordinates: 40.62772°N 74.63476°W

Architecture
- Type: Vastu Shastra

Website
- www.venkateswaratemple.org

The Sri Venkateswara Temple is a Hindu temple located in Bridgewater, New Jersey, U.S. In 1998, the traditional stone temple was inaugurated. The temple is 11,000 square feet.

== History ==
In 1989, a group of practicing Hindus in areas surrounding New Jersey established the Hindu Temple and Cultural Society of USA Inc. (HTCS). In February 1992, the HTCS purchased land in Bridgewater, New Jersey in hopes of building a traditional stone temple. Devotees began engaging in regularly scheduled spiritual activities and worship in the building previously built on the purchased land, as the planning for a new temple continued. In 1995, the ground breaking ceremony of the new temple was performed. In May 1996, a stone laying ceremony was conducted by Chinna Jeeyar Swami and the temple construction began according to the Vastu Shastras. In 1998, consecration ceremony was conducted by Chinna Jeeyar Swami and other priests and the temple was inaugurated.

In 2004, the temple applied to the Bridgewater zoning board to expand their facilities. In 2009, after a five-year legal battle, the board approved a scaled down version of the plan.

== Deities ==
There are 16 shrines within the temple which include sacred images of Venkateswara, Sridevi, Bhudevi, Garuda, Ganesha, Ambika, Nandi, Siva Lingam, Ayyappa, Subrahmanya, Satyanarayana, Durga, Saraswati, Lakshmi, Lakshmi Narayan, Radha Krishna, Rama, Anjaneya, Navagraha and Dhwajastambham.
