= Bridgewater Township, New Jersey =

Township in Somerset County, New Jersey, US

- Township
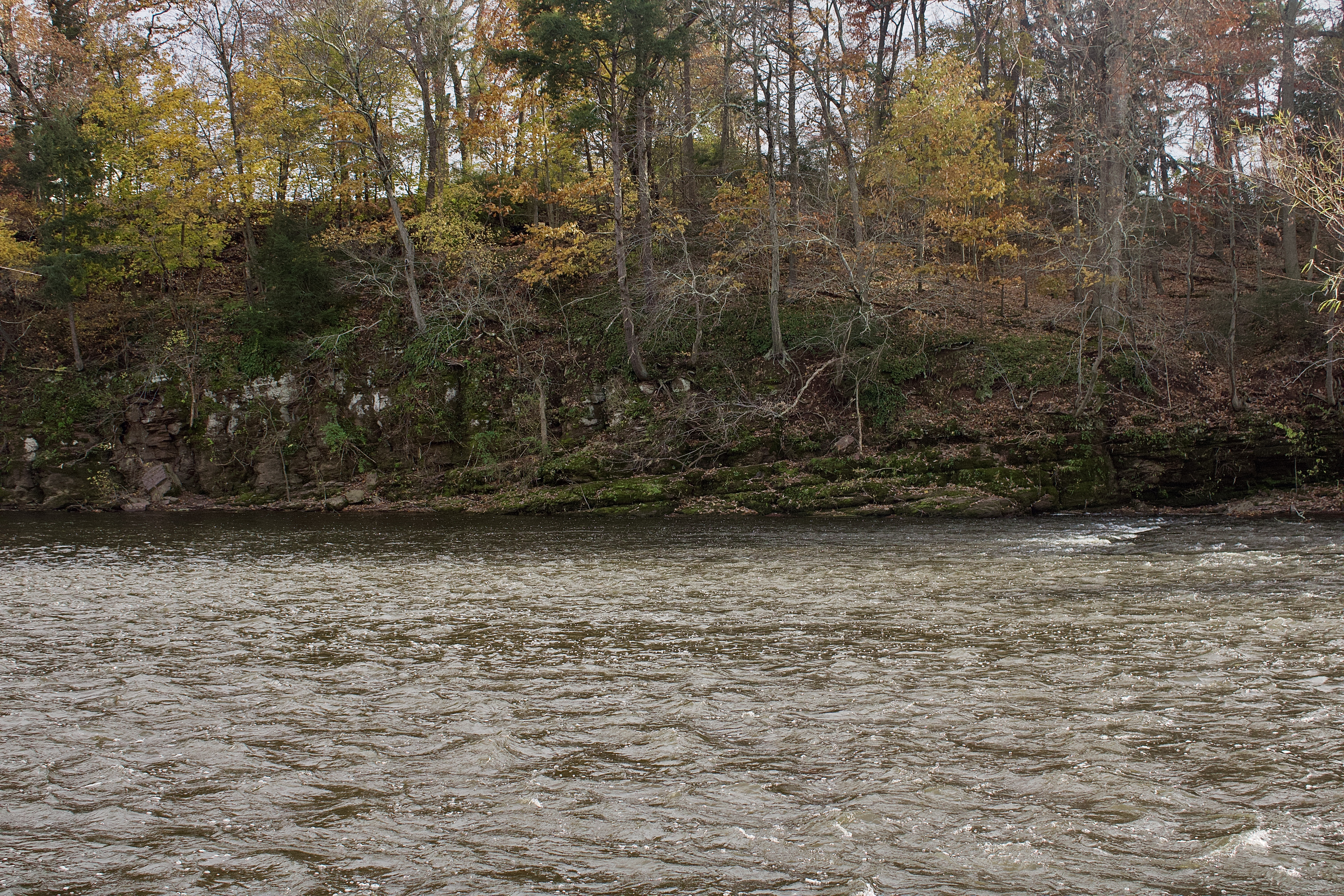
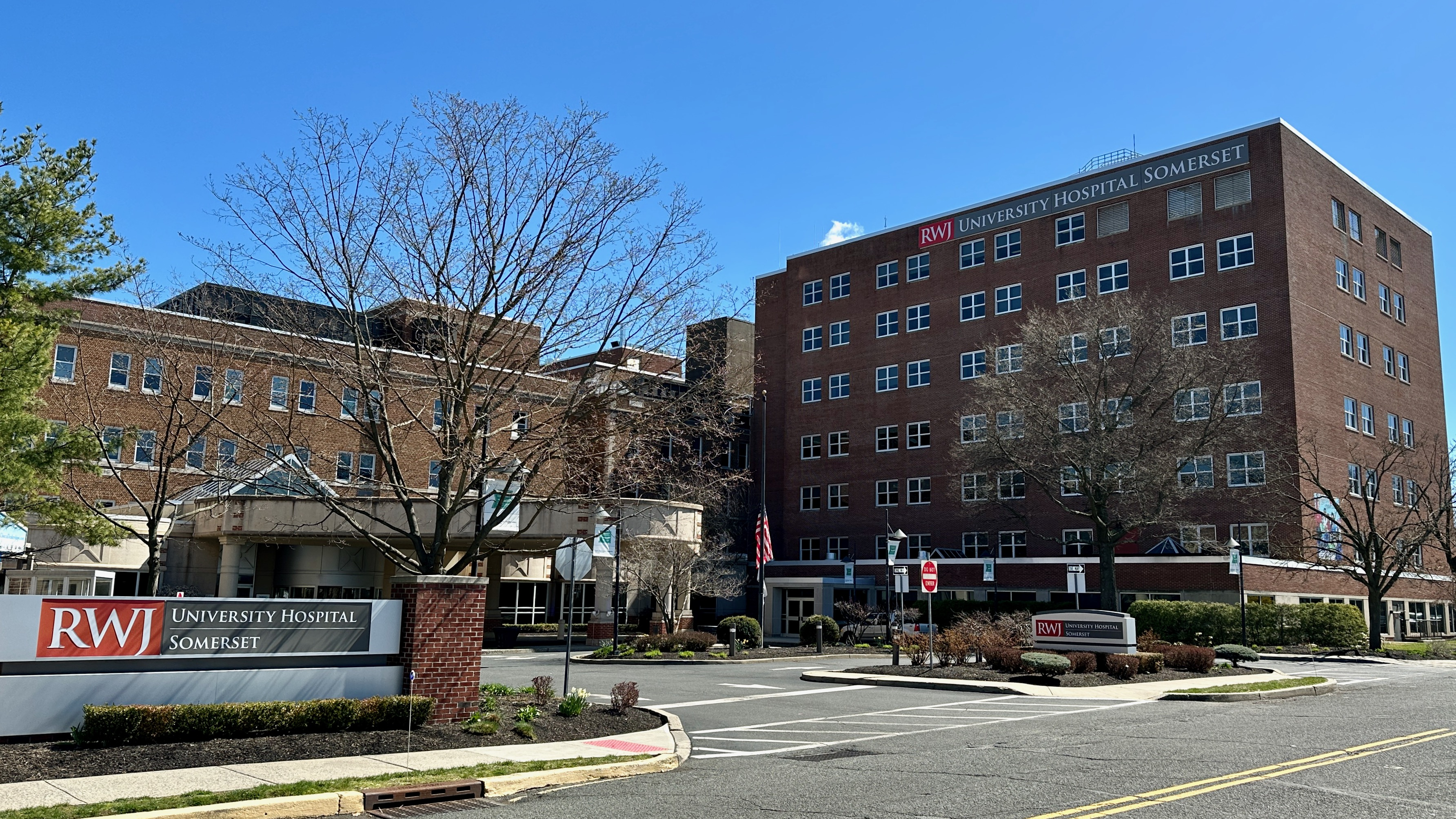
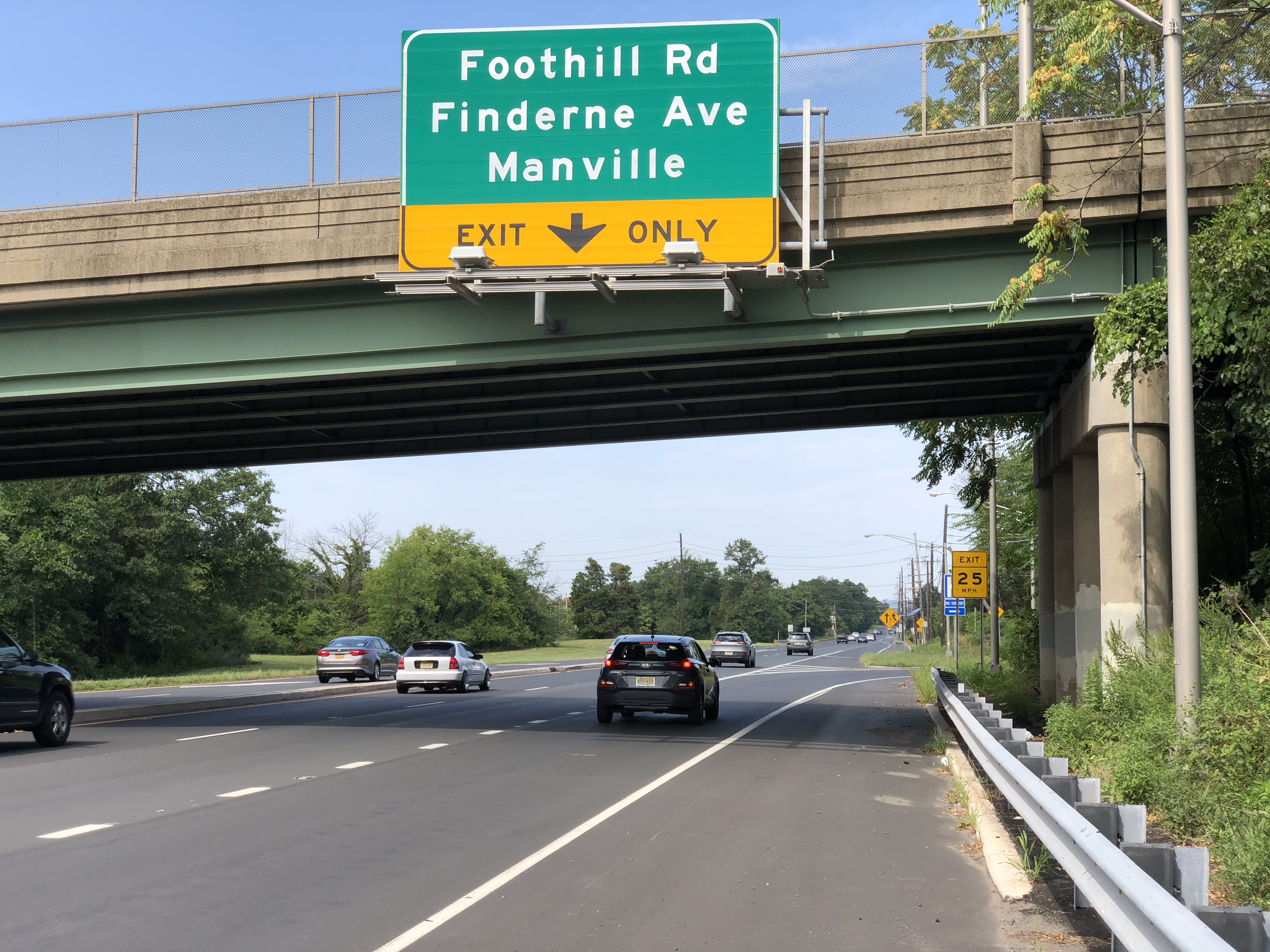
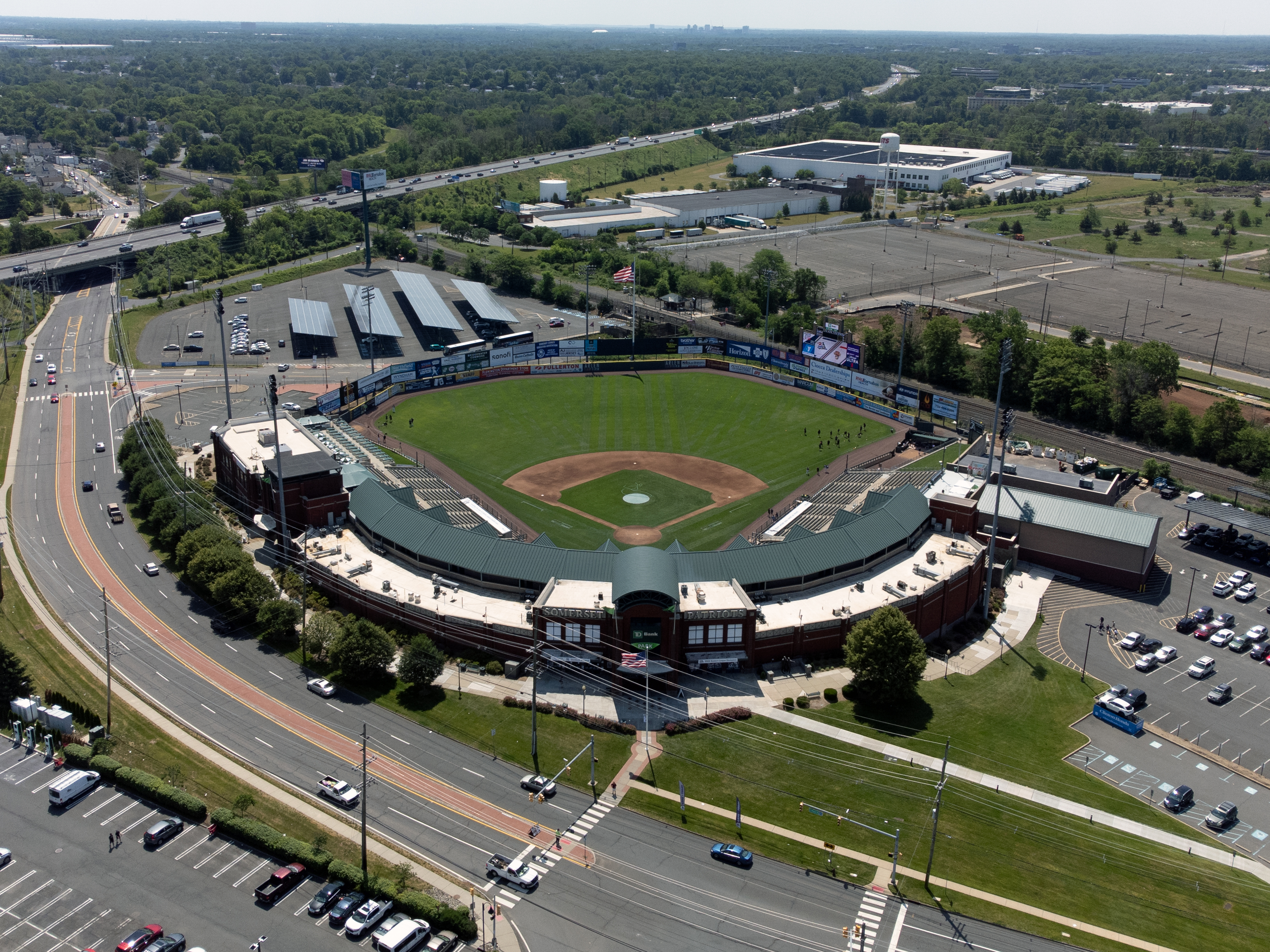
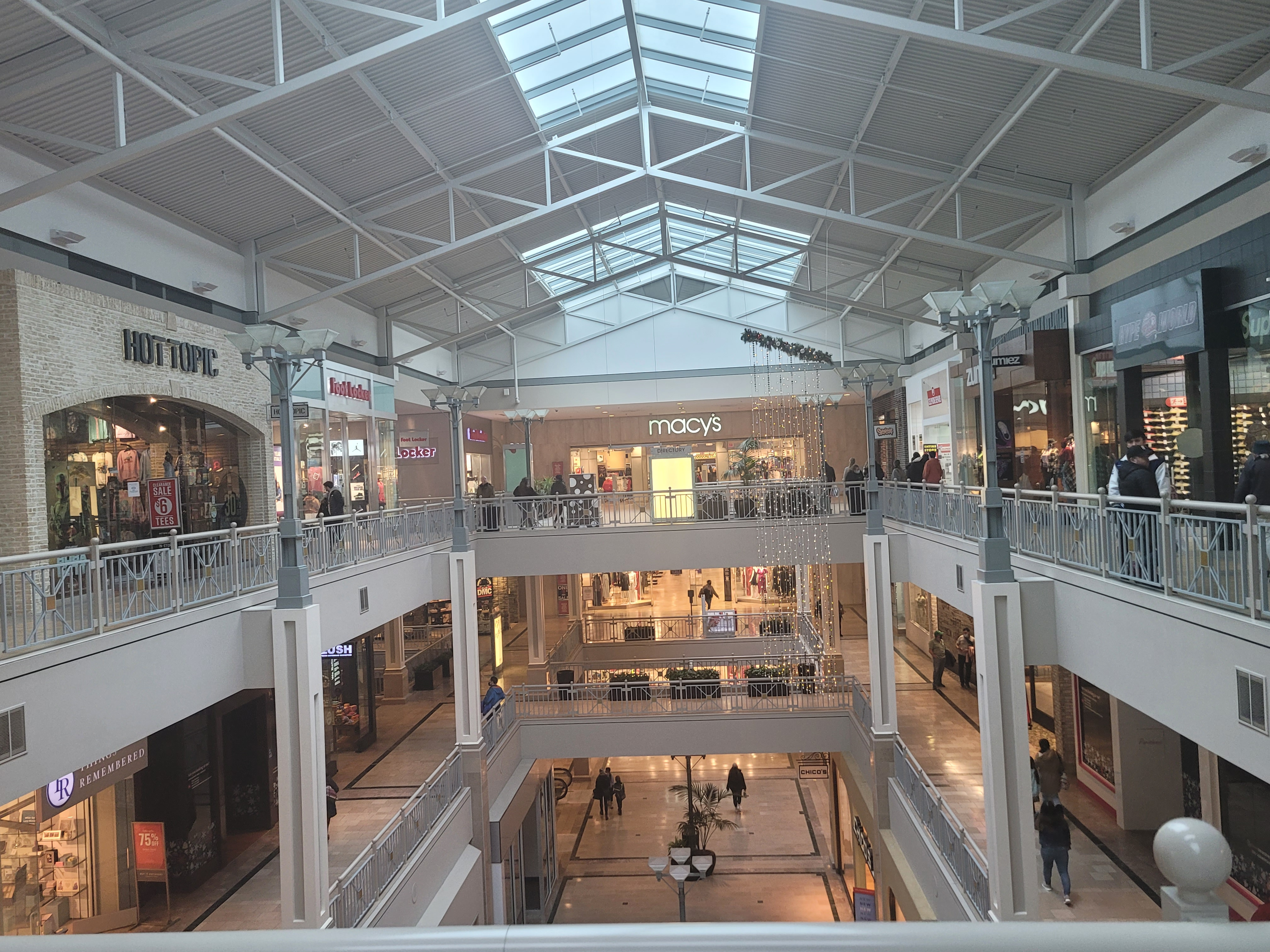
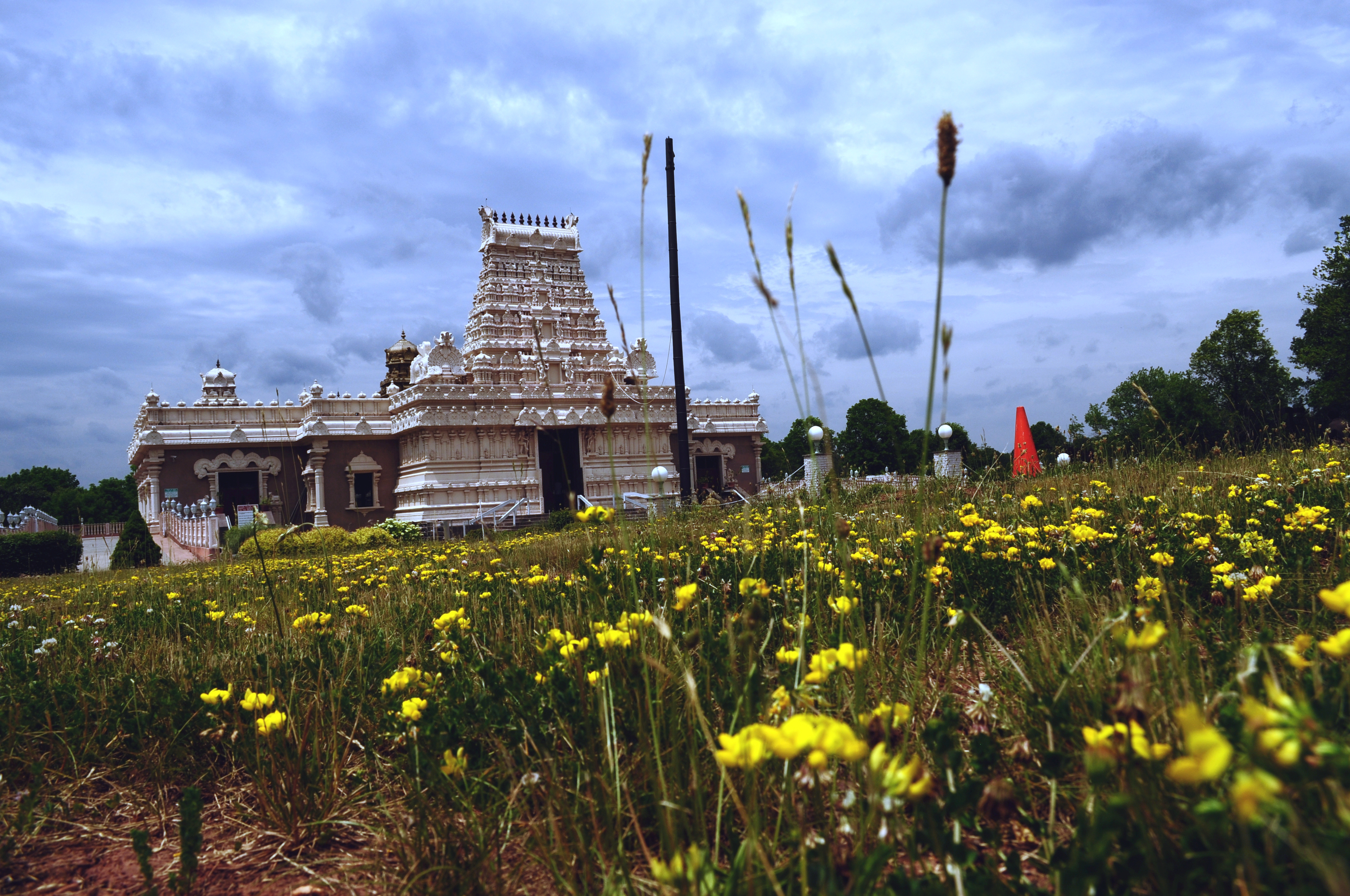
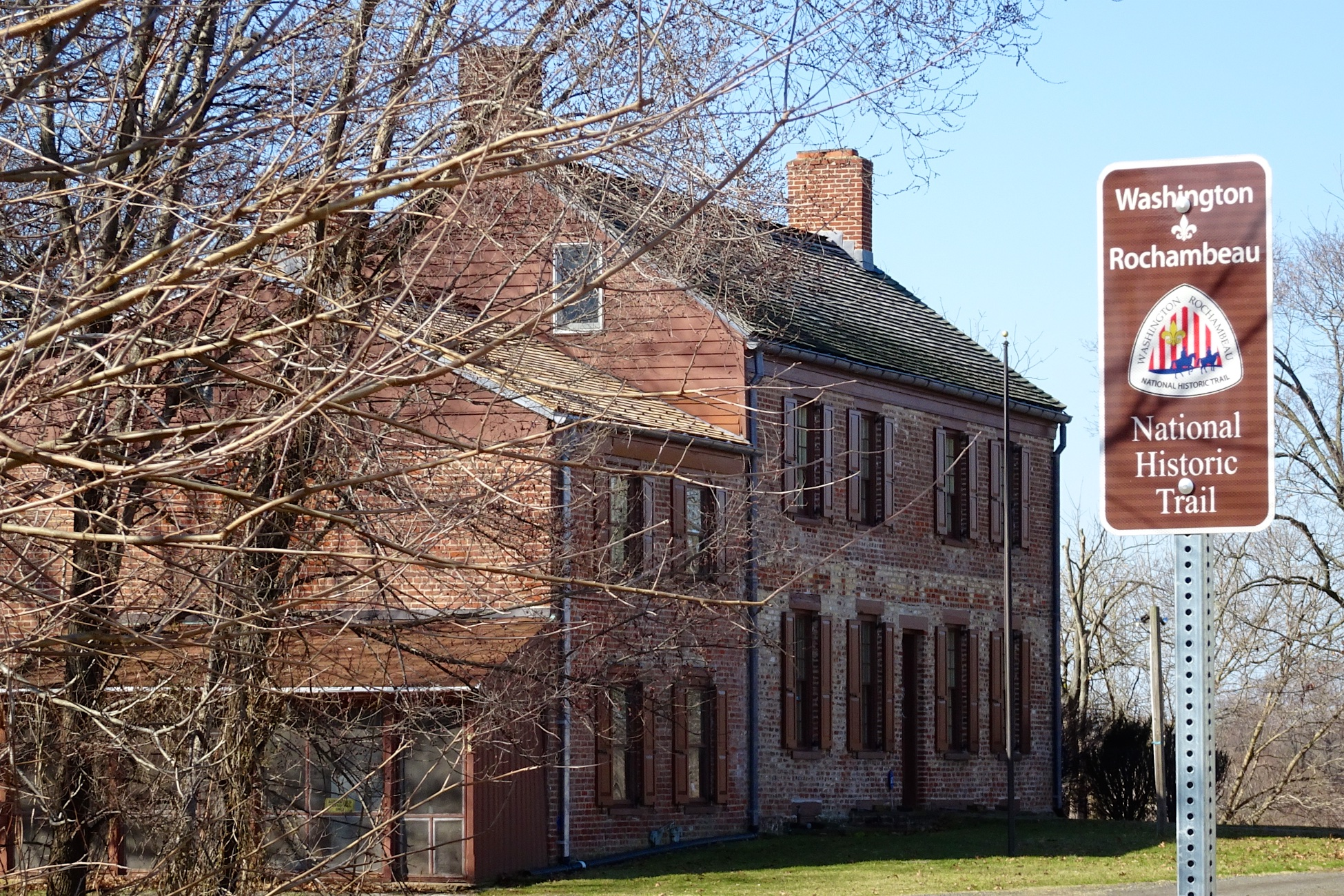
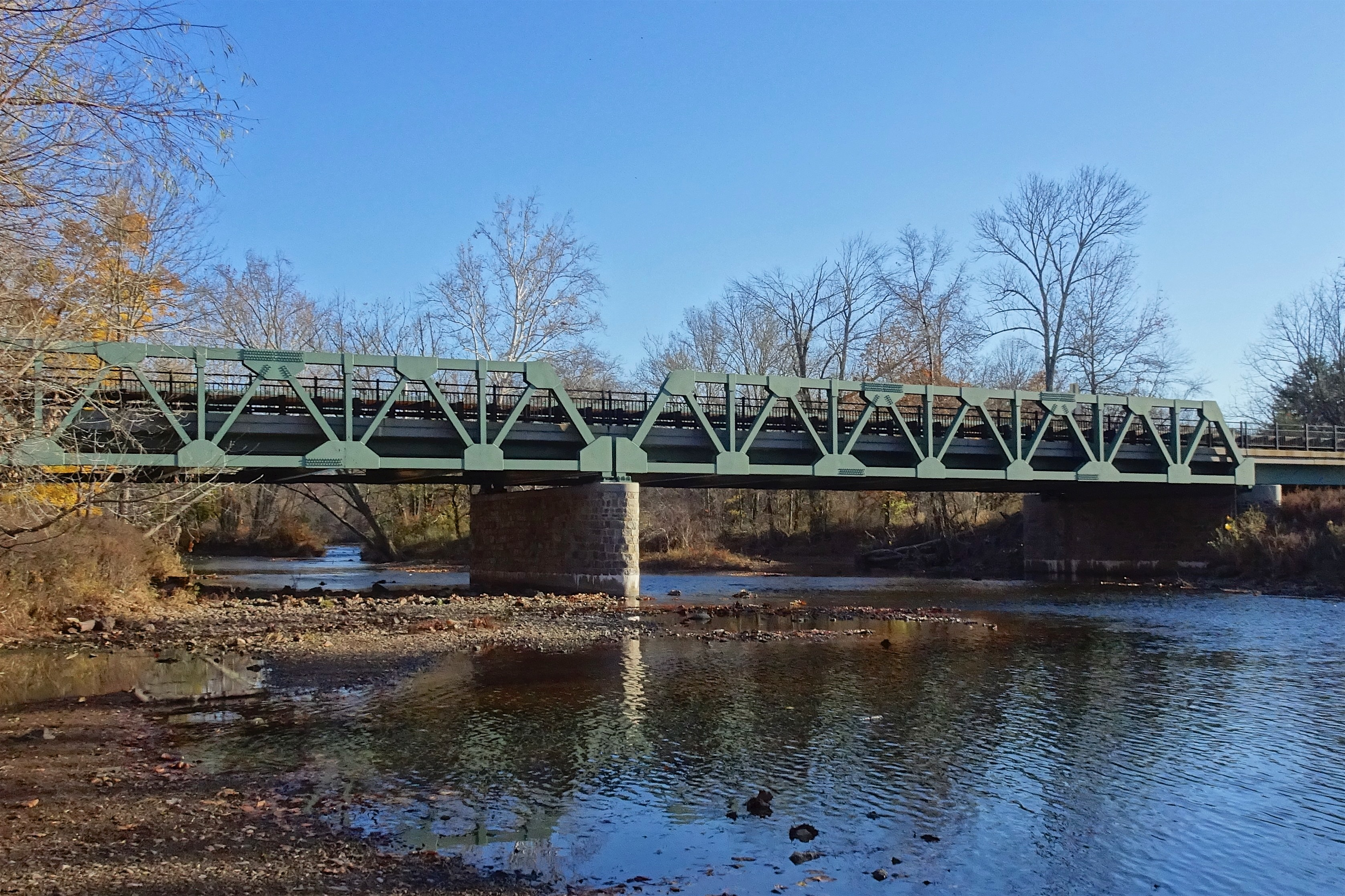
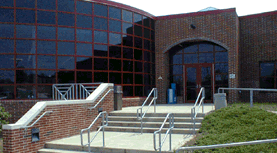
- Raritan River as seen from Duke Island Park RWJ Somerset University Hospital U.S. Route 22 TD Bank Ballpark Bridgewater Commons Sri Venkateswara Temple Van Veghten House North Branch Bridge Bridgewater-Raritan High School

- Seal

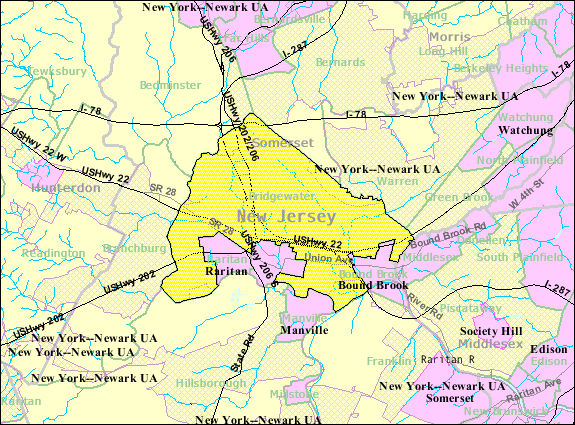
- Census Bureau map of Bridgewater Township, New Jersey
- Interactive map of Bridgewater Township, New Jersey
- Location in Somerset County Location in New Jersey Location in the United States
- Coordinates: 40.592358°N 74.60401°W
- Country: United States
- State: New Jersey
- County: Somerset
- Royal charter: April 4, 1749
- Incorporated: February 21, 1798
- Named for: English town of Bridgwater

Government
  - Type: Faulkner Act Mayor-council
  - Body: Township Council
  - Mayor: Matthew Moench (R, term ends December 31, 2024)
  - Administrator: Michael Pappas
  - Municipal clerk: Grace W. Njuguna

Area
  - Total: 32.36 sq mi (83.81 km^{2})
  - Land: 31.89 sq mi (82.59 km^{2})
  - Water: 0.47 sq mi (1.23 km^{2}) 1.46%
  - Rank: 76th of 565 in state 4th of 21 in county
- Elevation: 138 ft (42 m)

Population (2020)
  - Total: 45,977
  - Estimate (2023): 45,814
  - Rank: 46th of 565 in state 2nd of 21 in county
  - Density: 1,441.8/sq mi (556.7/km^{2})
  - Rank: 342nd of 565 in state 9th of 21 in county
- Time zone: UTC−05:00 (Eastern (EST))
  - Summer (DST): UTC−04:00 (Eastern (EDT))
- ZIP Codes: 08807 - Bridgewater; 08836 – Martinsville; 08805 – Bound Brook
- Area codes: 732 and 908
- FIPS code: 3403507720
- GNIS feature ID: 0882171
- Website: www.bridgewaternj.gov

Bridgewater Township is a township in Somerset County in the U.S. state of New Jersey, located within the heart of the Raritan Valley region. Situated within Central New Jersey and crisscrossed by several major highways, the township is known for being both the regional commercial hub for Somerset County (home to Bridgewater Commons and different corporate headquarters) and as a suburban bedroom community of New York City within the New York metropolitan area. The township is located roughly 32 miles (51 km) away from Manhattan and about 20 miles (32 km) away from Staten Island.

Bridgewater Township was created by Royal charter on April 4, 1749, from portions of the Northern precinct. It was incorporated as one of New Jersey's initial group of 104 townships by the New Jersey Legislature on February 21, 1798, under the Township Act of 1798. During the nineteenth century, portions of the township were taken to form Warren Township (March 5, 1806), Branchburg Township (April 5, 1845), Somerville (March 25, 1863), Raritan (April 3, 1868) and Bound Brook (March 24, 1869).

As of the 2020 United States census, the township's population was 45,977, an increase of 1,513 (+3.4%) from the 2010 census count of 44,464, which in turn reflected an increase of 1,524 (+3.5%) from the 42,940 counted in the 2000 census.

== History ==
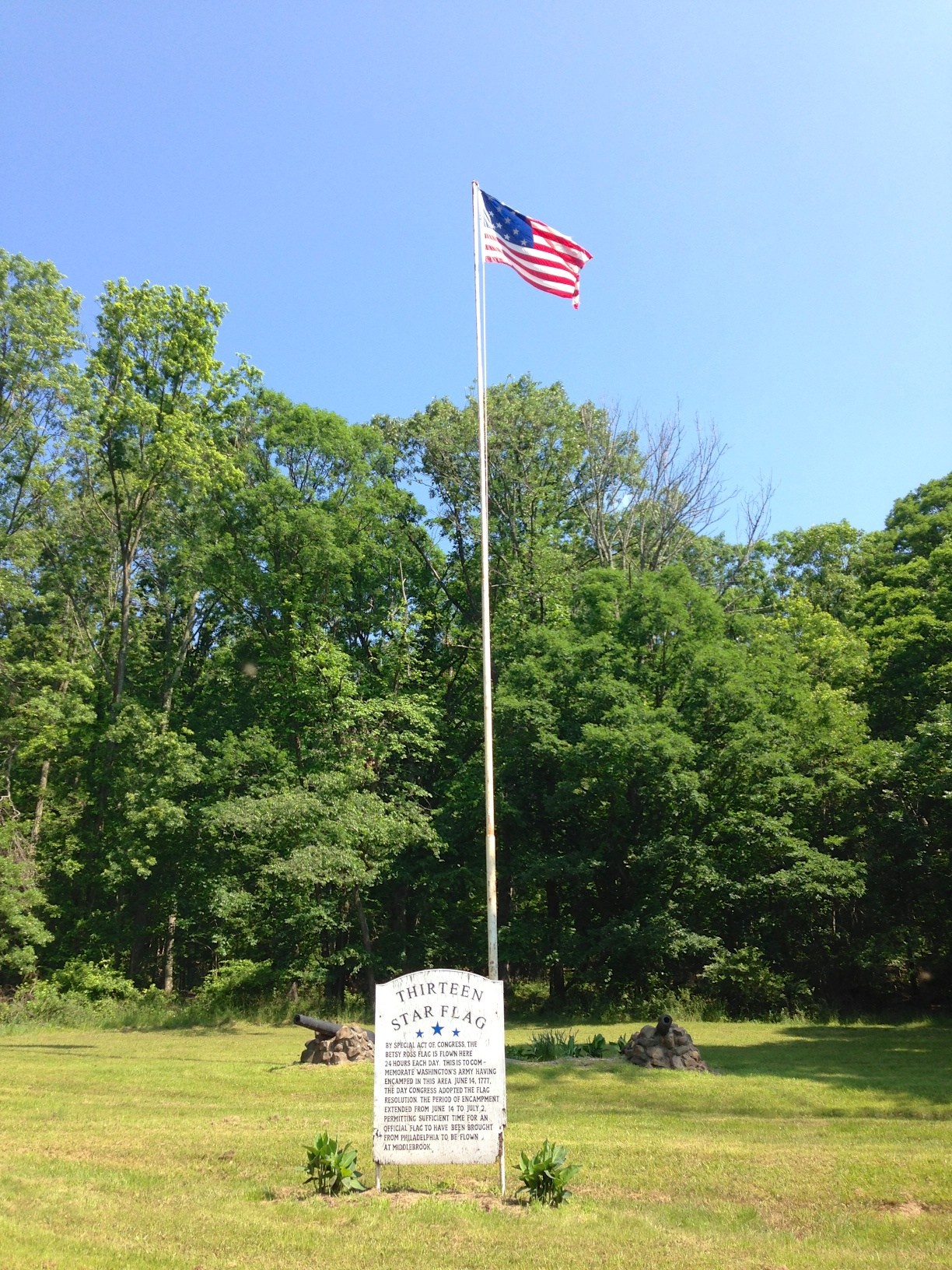
The thirteen-star flag at the site of the Middlebrook encampment in Bridgewater is displayed continuously.

Bridgewater is a relatively large, suburban township located in the center of Somerset County. The area of the present Township of Bridgewater was originally purchased from a local Lenape Native American tribe. Bridgewater was chartered by George II of Great Britain in 1749 and incorporated on February 21, 1798, as one of New Jersey's 104 original townships. It is named after the town of Bridgwater in the English county of Somerset.

Tradition holds that it was at the Middlebrook encampment the first official flag of the United States was unfurled, after law to adopt a national flag had been passed by Congress on June 14, 1777. By special order of Congress, a thirteen-star flag is flown 24 hours a day at the Washington Camp Ground, part of the former Middlebrook encampment, in Bridgewater. Since 1889, the first hoisting of the flag is commemorated annually each July 4 with a changing of the flag, a reading of the Declaration of Independence and the delivery of a historical address.

Until the 1960s, Bridgewater was largely known as a farming community. In the 1970s its population began to grow when residents of larger cities such as Plainfield and Newark started to migrate into Bridgewater as a result of the 1967 Plainfield Riots and 1967 Newark riots. Subsequently, Bridgewater started to receive an influx of residents who worked in the strong pharmaceutical, telecommunications and financial industries in Bridgewater and the Raritan Valley. More recently, there has also been growth as Bridgewater has become more popular with New York City commuters who use the Bridgewater Station on New Jersey Transit's Raritan Valley Line or Interstate 78 East to commute to New York City. Bridgewater is now a fairly developed suburban community, with only a few traces of its rural past still evident in the town (particularly in its northwestern section). Bridgewater is now Somerset County's second-most populous municipality, after Franklin Township.

== Geography ==
According to the United States Census Bureau, the township had a total area of 32.36 square miles (83.81 km^{2}), including 31.89 square miles (82.59 km^{2}) of land and 0.47 square miles (1.23 km^{2}) of water (1.46%).

While much of Bridgewater has a relatively flat terrain, the northeastern portion of the township is very hilly, with the First Ridge of the Watchung Mountains (sometimes known as the First Watchung Mountain) passing through the township. Additionally, the Second Ridge (Second Watchung Mountain) passes north of the township border. At the border with Warren Township, the Second Ridge features a prominent basalt cliff face at the former Dock Watch Quarry.

The Raritan River and its branches and tributaries form much of Bridgewater's borders with other municipalities and a number of smaller rivers and streams run through Bridgewater. The Raritan itself runs along Bridgewater's southern border (except where Somerville and Raritan were carved out as separate boroughs) and the North Branch of the Raritan River forms the township's western border with Branchburg. The North Branch and South Branch of the Raritan River meet at the extreme southwestern corner of Bridgewater at the border with both Branchburg Township and Hillsborough Township; this point, known as the Raritan River Confluence, was once intended to be a major reservoir.

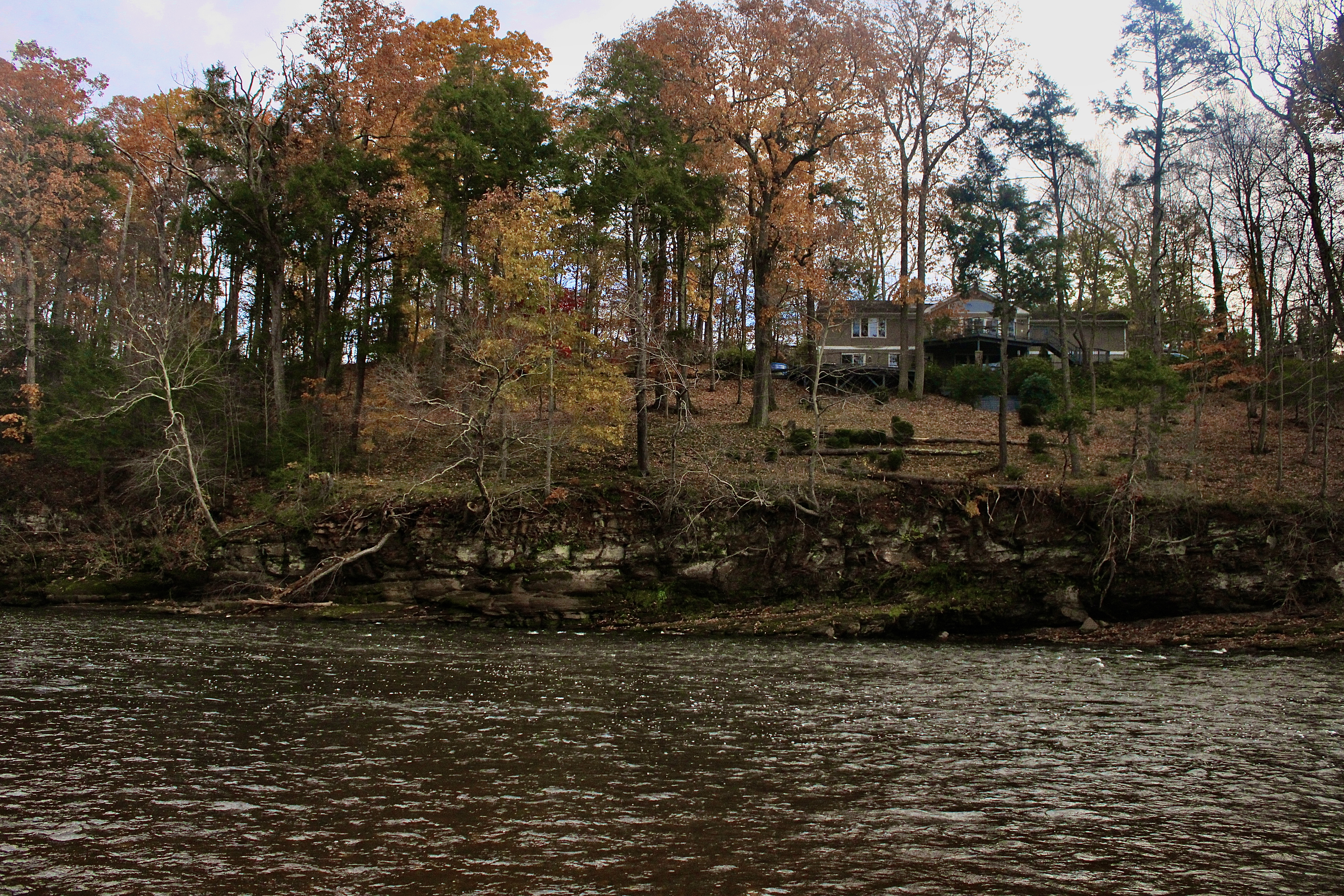
The Raritan River as it flows in Bridgewater

Bradley Gardens (with a 2020 Census population of 14,077), Bridgewater Center (6,082), Finderne (6,392), Green Knoll (6,594), and Martinsville (12,147) are census-designated places and unincorporated communities located within Bridgewater Township. Other unincorporated communities, localities and place names located partially or completely within the township include Chimney Rock, Hobbstown, Middle Brook Heights, Milltown, and Sunset Lake.

Bridgewater borders 13 other municipalities. Its longest borders are with Branchburg Township, Bedminster Township, Bernards Township, Warren Township, Bound Brook, Somerville, and Raritan. It also borders Green Brook (though connected only by Route 22), Middlesex (though connected only by one local street), South Bound Brook (a very short border in the middle of the Raritan River), Franklin Township (the only street connection is Interstate 287), Manville (the only street connection is Finderne Avenue, a county highway), and Hillsborough Township (no direct street connection).

Bridgewater Township's ZIP Code is 08807, with 08836 used in the community of Martinsville, and 08805 used in the Thomae Park section (mailing address of Bound Brook). Bridgewater's area codes are 908 and 732/848. Bridgewater is in Raritan Valley (a line of cities in Central New Jersey). Bridgewater lies in the western division of the Raritan Valley along with Branchburg and Raritan.

=== Communities ===
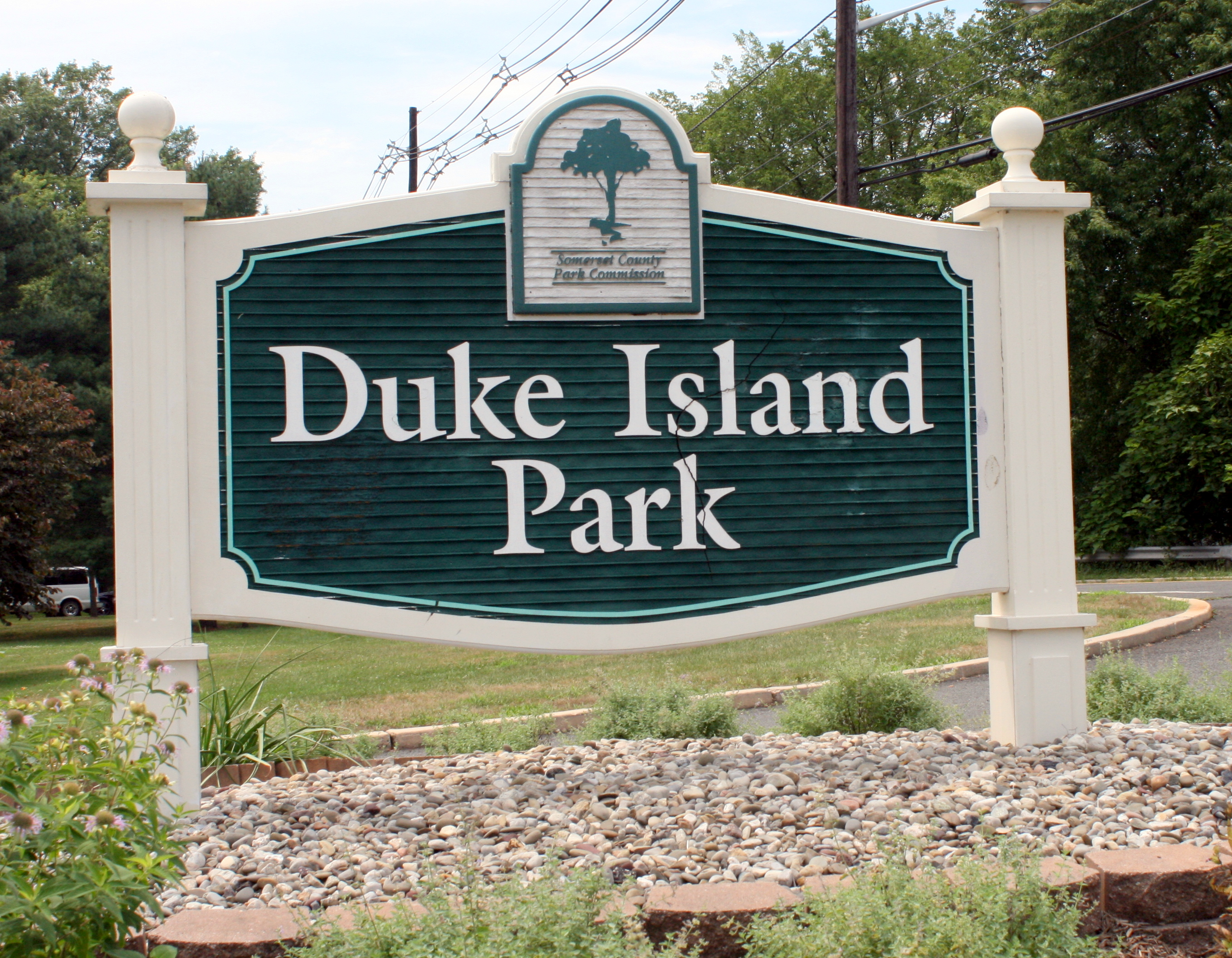
Duke Island Park in the Bradley Gardens section

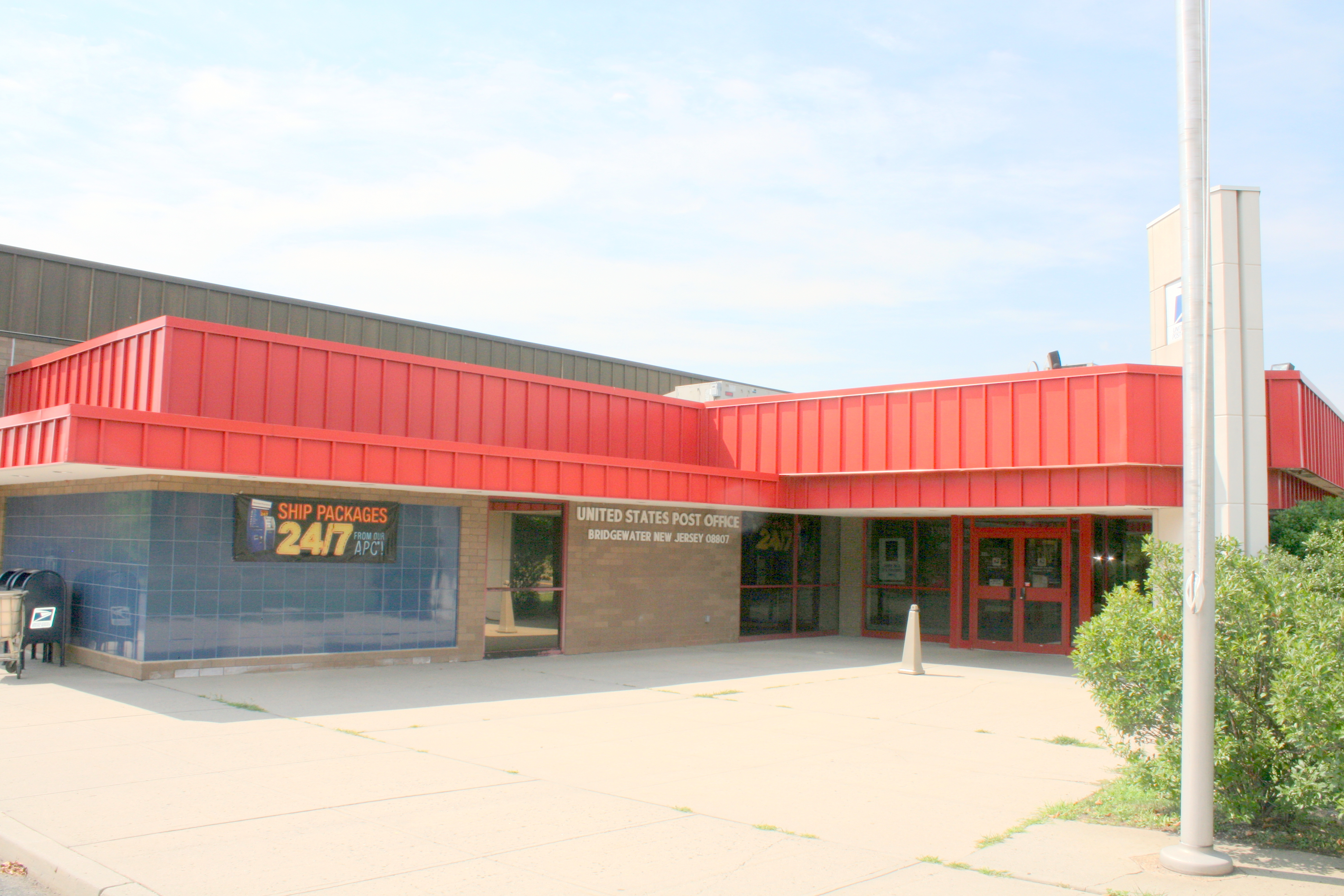
Post office off of N. Bridge St.

Bridgewater contains a number of communities and sections, many of which do not have officially defined boundaries. They include:

- Bradley Gardens: Located in southwestern Bridgewater, bordered on the east by Raritan and Branchburg to the west. This is one of Bridgewater's older residential areas but also includes some newer developments as well as a commercial area along Old York Road.
- Bridgewater Center: Located in the west-central part of Bridgewater, bordered to the northeast by Green Knoll (along Interstate 287), to the southwest by Bradley Gardens (along Route 28), to the south by Raritan (also along Route 28) and Somerville (along U.S. Route 22), to the northwest by Bedminster Township and the west by Branchburg.
- North Branch (eastern portion): Most of North Branch is in Branchburg, but a portion lies to the east of the North Branch of the Raritan River, in Bridgewater Township.
- Finderne: Located in southeastern Bridgewater between Bound Brook and Somerville. This is a diverse area with older neighborhoods bordering Foothill Road, newer developments, multi-unit housing near the Raritan River/Manville border, as well as commercial and industrial areas. The Middlebrook Crossing industrial park, the Promenade shopping center and TD Bank Ballpark, home to the Somerset Patriots, are located here.
- Green Knoll: Located in central Bridgewater, this is a residential area with many major commercial developments and government facilities, including the Bridgewater Commons Mall at the intersection of U.S. Route 22 and U.S. Route 202-206, a large office park west of the Commons across 202–206, the municipal building and police station and Bridgewater-Raritan High School.
- Country Club/Meadow Road Area: This area is referred to by some as the "Country Club-Meadow Road area" or similar names, after the major north–south streets there. Some also refer to it as "the Van Holten area" after the elementary school located there. It borders Bedminster and Branchburg.
- Milltown/Vanderveer Road Area: This area is northeast of Bradley Gardens bordering Raritan and Branchburg. It is mainly a residential community with many new homes.
- Martinsville: Located in northeastern Bridgewater near Warren Township and Bernards Township. This is an affluent, predominantly residential area, though it does have its own commercial center along Washington Valley Road and its own post office and ZIP Code. This also is a very hilly area; it is the portion of Bridgewater through which the Watchung Mountains pass.
- Sunset Lake: Built around a man-made lake in the extreme northern part of Bridgewater, near the interchange of Interstate 287 and Interstate 78. Some of its residents have the Basking Ridge ZIP Code 07920.

== Demographics ==
Historical population
Census	Pop.	Note	%±
1790	2,578		—
1810	2,906		—
1820	3,147		8.3%
1830	3,549		12.8%
1840	3,986		12.3%
1850	4,070	*	2.1%
1860	4,947		21.5%
1870	2,082	*	−57.9%
1880	1,912		−8.2%
1890	1,444		−24.5%
1900	1,601		10.9%
1910	1,742		8.8%
1920	1,934		11.0%
1930	3,352		73.3%
1940	4,934		47.2%
1950	8,234		66.9%
1960	15,789		91.8%
1970	30,235		91.5%
1980	29,175		−3.5%
1990	32,509		11.4%
2000	42,940		32.1%
2010	44,464		3.5%
2020	45,977		3.4%
2023 (est.)	45,814		−0.4%
Population sources: 1790–1920 1840 1850–1870; 1850 1870 1880–1890; 1890–1910 1910–1930; 1940–2000 2000; 2010 2020 * = Lost territory in previous decade.

According to National Geographic magazine, Bridgewater has an unusually high number of twins and triplets.

=== 2010 census ===
The 2010 United States census counted 44,464 people, 16,111 households, and 12,035 families in the township. The population density was 1,387.9 per square mile (535.9/km^{2}). There were 16,657 housing units at an average density of 519.9 per square mile (200.7/km^{2}). The racial makeup was 76.46% (33,996) White, 2.38% (1,059) Black or African American, 0.10% (46) Native American, 17.83% (7,927) Asian, 0.00% (2) Pacific Islander, 1.46% (647) from other races, and 1.77% (787) from two or more races. Hispanic or Latino people of any race were 6.76% (3,004) of the population.

Of the 16,111 households, 38.3% had children under the age of 18; 64.1% were married couples living together; 8.0% had a female householder with no husband present and 25.3% were non-families. Of all households, 21.8% were made up of individuals and 10.3% had someone living alone who was 65 years of age or older. The average household size was 2.72 and the average family size was 3.21.

25.5% of the population were under the age of 18, 5.6% from 18 to 24, 23.7% from 25 to 44, 30.5% from 45 to 64, and 14.7% who were 65 years of age or older. The median age was 42.2 years. For every 100 females, the population had 91.8 males. For every 100 females ages 18 and older there were 87.8 males.

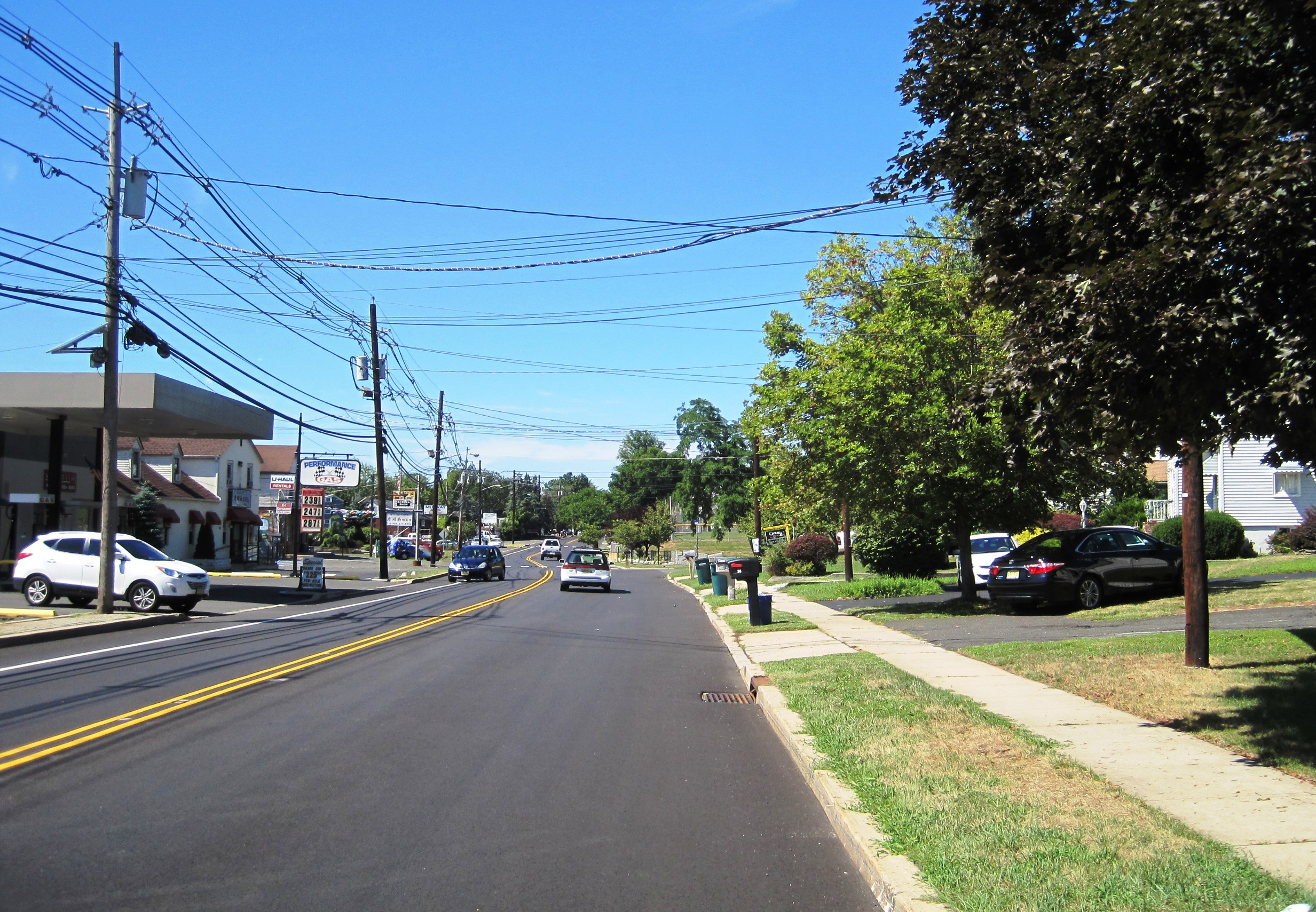
The Bradley Gardens neighborhood in the township

The Census Bureau's 2006–2010 American Community Survey showed that (in 2010 inflation-adjusted dollars) median household income was $108,680 (with a margin of error of +/− $5,095) and the median family income was $130,594 (+/− $6,507). Males had a median income of $90,875 (+/− $4,851) versus $65,501 (+/− $4,264) for females. The per capita income for the township was $46,994 (+/− $1,811). About 1.6% of families and 2.9% of the population were below the poverty line, including 3.1% of those under age 18 and 5.4% of those age 65 or over.

=== 2000 census ===
At the 2000 United States census, there were 42,940 people, 15,561 households, and 11,888 families residing in the township. The population density was 1,323.4 inhabitants per square mile (511.0/km^{2}). There were 15,879 housing units at an average density of 489.4/sq mi (189.0/km^{2}). The racial makeup of the township was 83.07% White, 2.17% African American, 0.08% Native American, 11.54% Asian, 0.01% Pacific Islander, 0.89% from other races, and 1.25% from two or more races. Hispanic or Latino people of any race were 4.79% of the population. 21.3% were of Italian, 17.1% Irish, 16.7% German and 11.8% Polish ancestry.

There were 15,561 households, of which 38.0% had children under the age of 18 living with them, 66.6% were married couples living together, 7.3% had a female householder with no husband present, and 23.6% were non-families. 19.8% of all households were made up of individuals, and 7.6% had someone living alone who was 65 years of age or older. The average household size was 2.71 and the average family size was 3.14.

25.7% of the population were under the age of 18, 4.9% from 18 to 24, 32.6% from 25 to 44, 24.2% from 45 to 64, and 12.7% who were 65 years of age or older. The median age was 38 years. For every 100 females, there were 92.5 males. For every 100 females age 18 and over, there were 88.4 males.

The median household income was $88,308 and the median family income was $99,832. Males had a median income of $67,089 versus $49,096 for females. The per capita income for the township was $39,555. About 1.6% of families and 2.1% of the population were below the poverty line, including 1.7% of those under age 18 and 3.7% of those age 65 or over.

== Economy ==
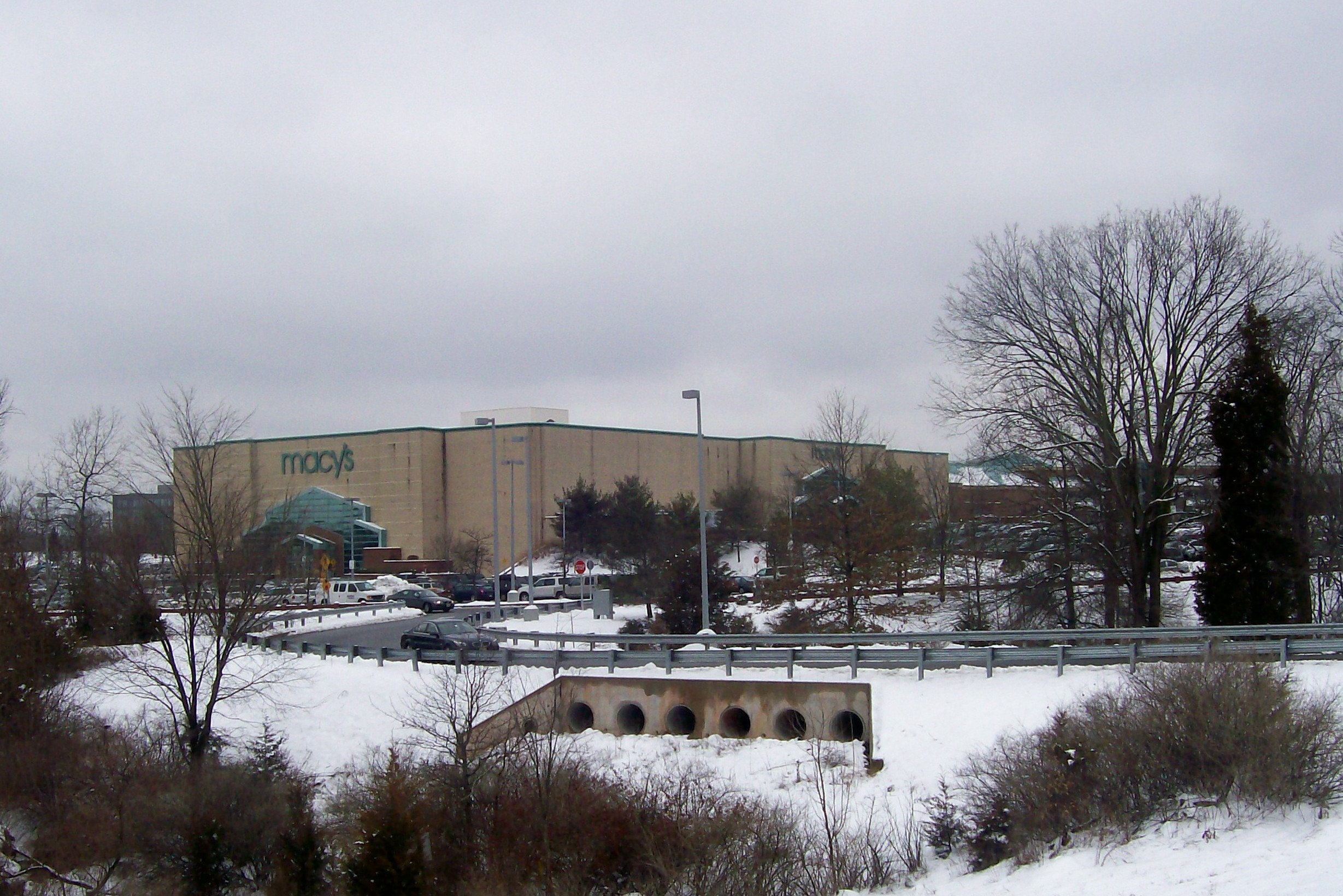
Bridgewater Commons

The township has long been a hub for pharmaceutical companies including Valeant, Allergan, Amneal Pharmaceuticals, many small and mid-size ones. Sanofi's US headquarters are in Bridgewater. Bridgewater is also home to many Fortune 500 companies across various industries from software to financial services.

Bridgewater Commons is a large regional shopping mall anchored by Bloomingdale's and Macy's, with a gross leasable area of 994,000 square feet (92,300 m^{2}). There are also several smaller but substantial shopping areas such as Bridgewater Promenade, Chimney Rock shopping center, and Somerset shopping center.

== Parks and recreation ==
Washington Camp Ground (also known as Middlebrook encampment), north of Bound Brook, is a preserved portion of the land on which the army of George Washington encamped during the winter of 1778–1779, though the general himself stayed in a house in Somerville.

The area also offers many parks and other recreational facilities, including Washington Valley Park.

== Sports ==
TD Bank Ballpark is home to the Somerset Patriots. The 6,100-seat stadium was constructed in 1999. As an independent team, the Patriots were a founding member of the Atlantic League of Professional Baseball in 1998. The Patriots became the Double-A Minor League Baseball affiliate of the New York Yankees in 2021.

Club	Sport	League	Venue	Established	Championships
Somerset Patriots	Baseball	Eastern League	TD Bank Ballpark	1998	6 (Atlantic League) 1 (Eastern League)

== Government ==
=== Local government ===
Bridgewater Township is governed within the Faulkner Act (formally known as the Optional Municipal Charter Law), under the Mayor-Council system of municipal government plan 2, as implemented on January 1, 1984, based on actions of the Township Committee. The township is one of 71 municipalities (of the 564) statewide that use this form of government. The governing body is composed of the Mayor and the five-member Township Council. All members of the governing body are chosen at-large on a partisan basis as part of the November general election in odd-numbered years. The mayoral seat comes up for vote every four years and council members are elected to serve four-terms of office on a staggered basis, with two seats coming up for election together with the mayor and three seats up for vote two years later. At a reorganization meeting held in January after each election, the committee selects a council president and vice president from among its members.

As of 2026, the mayor of Bridgewater Township is Republican Matthew C. Moench, whose term of office ends December 31, 2027. Members of the Bridgewater Township Council are Council President Joan Geiger (D, 2029), Council Vice President Andrew Bucko (D, 2029), Ridwana Isla (D, 2029), Timothy Ring (R, 2027), and Michael Kirsh (R, 2027). The Bridgewater Township Council had been fully under Republican control from at least 2013 until the three aforementioned Democrats were elected together in November 2025, ousting two of the then-incumbent Republicans, Allen Kurdyla and Filipe Pedroso, also defeating Matthew Moench's sister, Megan, who was the third Republican town council candidate in that election.

Since January 2020, the township administrator is Michael Pappas, a former member of Congress.

=== Federal, state and county representation ===
Bridgewater Township is split between the 7th and 12th Congressional Districts and is part of New Jersey's 23rd state Legislative District.

Prior to the 2010 Census, Bridgewater Township had been part of the 7th Congressional District and the 11th Congressional District, a change made by the New Jersey Redistricting Commission that took effect in January 2013, based on the results of the November 2012 general elections.

For the 119th United States Congress, New Jersey's 7th congressional district is represented by Thomas Kean Jr. (R, Westfield). For the 119th United States Congress, New Jersey's 12th congressional district is represented by Bonnie Watson Coleman (D, Ewing Township). New Jersey is represented in the United States Senate by Democrats Cory Booker (Newark, term ends 2027) and Andy Kim (Moorestown, term ends 2031).

For the 2026–2027 session, the 23rd legislative district of the New Jersey Legislature is represented in the State Senate by Doug Steinhardt (R, Lopatcong Township) and in the General Assembly by John DiMaio (R, Hackettstown) and Erik Peterson (R, Franklin Township).

Somerset County is governed by a five-member Board of County Commissioners, whose members are elected at-large to three-year terms of office on a staggered basis, with one or two seats coming up for election each year. At an annual reorganization meeting held in the first week of January, the board selects a Director and deputy director from among its members. As of 2025, Somerset County's County Commissioners are Director Shanel Robinson (D, Franklin Township, term as commissioner ends 2027; term as director ends 2026), Deputy Director Paul Drake (D, Hillsborough Township, term as commissioner and as deputy director ends 2026), Melonie Marano (D, Green Brook Township, 2028), Elizabeth Graner (D, Bernards Township, 2026; elected to serve an unexpired term) and Sara Sooy (D, Bedminster Township, 2027).

Constitutional officers, elected on a countywide basis are Clerk Steve Peter (D, Somerville, 2027), Sheriff Darrin Russo (D, Franklin Township, 2028) and Surrogate Bernice "Tina" Jalloh (D, Franklin Township, 2030).

=== Politics ===
As of March 2011, there were a total of 28,049 registered voters in Bridgewater Township, of which 6,468 (23.1% vs. 26.0% countywide) were registered as Democrats, 7,618 (27.2% vs. 25.7%) were registered as Republicans and 13,947 (49.7% vs. 48.2%) were registered as Unaffiliated. There were 16 voters registered to other parties. Among the township's 2010 Census population, 63.1% (vs. 60.4% in Somerset County) were registered to vote, including 84.7% of those ages 18 and over (vs. 80.4% countywide).

United States presidential election results for Bridgewater Township
Year	Republican		Democratic		Third party(ies)	
Year	No.	%	No.	%	No.	%
2024	11,767	46.30%	13,127	51.65%	523	2.06%
2020	11,561	43.78%	14,667	55.55%	177	0.67%
2016	10,813	47.59%	10,985	48.35%	923	4.06%
2012	10,664	52.14%	9,561	46.75%	227	1.11%
2008	11,346	51.64%	10,357	47.14%	267	1.22%
2004	11,641	55.66%	9,104	43.53%	170	0.81%
2000	9,007	53.20%	7,350	43.41%	573	3.38%

In the 2012 presidential election, Republican Mitt Romney received 52.1% of the vote (10,664 cast), ahead of Democrat Barack Obama with 46.7% (9,561 votes), and other candidates with 1.1% (227 votes), among the 20,592 ballots cast by the township's 29,510 registered voters (140 ballots were spoiled), for a turnout of 69.8%. In the 2008 presidential election, Republican John McCain received 11,346 votes (51.3% vs. 46.1% countywide), ahead of Democrat Barack Obama with 10,357 votes (46.8% vs. 52.1%) and other candidates with 267 votes (1.2% vs. 1.1%), among the 22,110 ballots cast by the township's 27,378 registered voters, for a turnout of 80.8% (vs. 78.7% in Somerset County). In the 2004 presidential election, Republican George W. Bush received 11,641 votes (55.5% vs. 51.5% countywide), ahead of Democrat John Kerry with 9,104 votes (43.4% vs. 47.2%) and other candidates with 170 votes (0.8% vs. 0.9%), among the 20,985 ballots cast by the township's 25,218 registered voters, for a turnout of 83.2% (vs. 81.7% in the whole county).

Gubernatorial election results for Bridgewater Township
Year	Republican		Democratic		Third party(ies)	
Year	No.	%	No.	%	No.	%
2025	9,294	45.14%	11,186	54.33%	109	0.53%
2021	8,977	52.39%	8,015	46.77%	144	0.84%
2017	7,378	54.94%	5,769	42.96%	282	2.10%
2013	9,213	72.73%	3,261	25.74%	193	1.52%
2009	9,542	62.12%	4,491	29.24%	1,327	8.64%
2005	7,875	57.14%	5,345	38.78%	563	4.08%

In the 2013 gubernatorial election, Republican Chris Christie received 72.7% of the vote (9,213 cast), ahead of Democrat Barbara Buono with 25.7% (3,261 votes), and other candidates with 1.5% (193 votes), among the 12,834 ballots cast by the township's 29,774 registered voters (167 ballots were spoiled), for a turnout of 43.1%. In the 2009 gubernatorial election, Republican Chris Christie received 9,542 votes (61.7% vs. 55.8% countywide), ahead of Democrat Jon Corzine with 4,491 votes (29.0% vs. 34.1%), Independent Chris Daggett with 1,238 votes (8.0% vs. 8.7%) and other candidates with 89 votes (0.6% vs. 0.7%), among the 15,462 ballots cast by the township's 27,822 registered voters, yielding a 55.6% turnout (vs. 52.5% in the county).

United States Senate election results for Bridgewater Township1
Year	Republican		Democratic		Third party(ies)	
Year	No.	%	No.	%	No.	%
2024	11,293	45.96%	12,753	51.90%	525	2.14%
2018	9,590	50.41%	8,780	46.15%	653	3.43%
2012	10,172	52.34%	8,885	45.72%	377	1.94%
2006	7,484	55.63%	5,564	41.36%	405	3.01%

United States Senate election results for Bridgewater Township2
Year	Republican		Democratic		Third party(ies)	
Year	No.	%	No.	%	No.	%
2020	12,032	45.77%	13,911	52.92%	346	1.32%
2014	6,017	56.30%	4,463	41.76%	208	1.95%
2013	4,978	58.33%	3,491	40.91%	65	0.76%
2008	11,472	55.54%	8,591	41.59%	593	2.87%

== Education ==
Bridgewater is part of the Bridgewater-Raritan Regional School District, which serves students in pre-kindergarten through twelfth grade from Bridgewater and Raritan Borough. As of the 2020–21 school year, the district, comprised of 11 schools, had an enrollment of 8,254 students and 754.4 classroom teachers (on an FTE basis), for a student–teacher ratio of 10.9:1. One of the largest suburban districts statewide, the district is the largest in Somerset County. Schools in the district (with 2020–21 enrollment data from the National Center for Education Statistics) are Adamsville Primary School (532 students; in grades PreK–4), Bradley Gardens Primary School (263; PreK–4), Crim Primary School (342; K–4), Hamilton Primary School (477; K–4), John F. Kennedy Primary School (427; K–4), Milltown Primary School (402; PreK–4), Van Holten Primary School (334; K–4), Eisenhower Intermediate School (704; 5–6), Hillside Intermediate School (574; 5–6), Bridgewater–Raritan Middle School (1,384; 7–8) and Bridgewater–Raritan High School (2,747; 9–12). All schools in the district are in Bridgewater except for Kennedy, which is in Raritan. The overwhelming majority of students in the district are from Bridgewater, with approximately 1,000 students from Raritan. Seats on the district's nine-member board of education are allocated based on population, with eight seats allocated to Bridgewater Township.

During the 1999–2000 school year, Bridgewater-Raritan High School was recognized with the Blue Ribbon School Award of Excellence by the United States Department of Education, the highest award an American school can receive from the federal government.

Bridgewater is the home of the Somerset County Vocational and Technical High School, a four-year magnet school that provides occupational and academic training to students from Somerset County and neighboring areas.

Little Friends of Jesus Nursery School (preschool, non-parochial) operates under the supervision of the Roman Catholic Diocese of Metuchen.

The headquarters of the Somerset County Library System is located in Bridgewater.

In 2013, Stephen Kovacs joined the staff of Medeo Fencing Club in Bridgewater as a coach. He was accused in 2021 by detectives from the Bridgewater Township Sex Crimes/Child Abuse Unit of sexually assaulting two teenage fencing students in Bridgewater multiple times in 2020 and 2021; he died in Somerset County Jail in January 2022.

== Infrastructure ==
=== Emergency services ===
The township's Communications Center handles all emergency calls with 11 full-time dispatchers and five part-time dispatchers as of 2013. The Bridgewater emergency dispatch is being transitioned to Somerset County at an unknown time frame, joining nine other county municipalities that have emergency calls handled centrally and dispatched to each individual police department. The move is expected to save the township $4.5 million over 10 years, saving $4.50 on the average tax bill.

==== Police ====
Bridgewater has 75 officers who are a part of the Bridgewater Township Police Department, which includes a patrol division, a detective bureau, a traffic unit, a communications bureau, a youth services bureau, and other divisions.

==== Fire ====
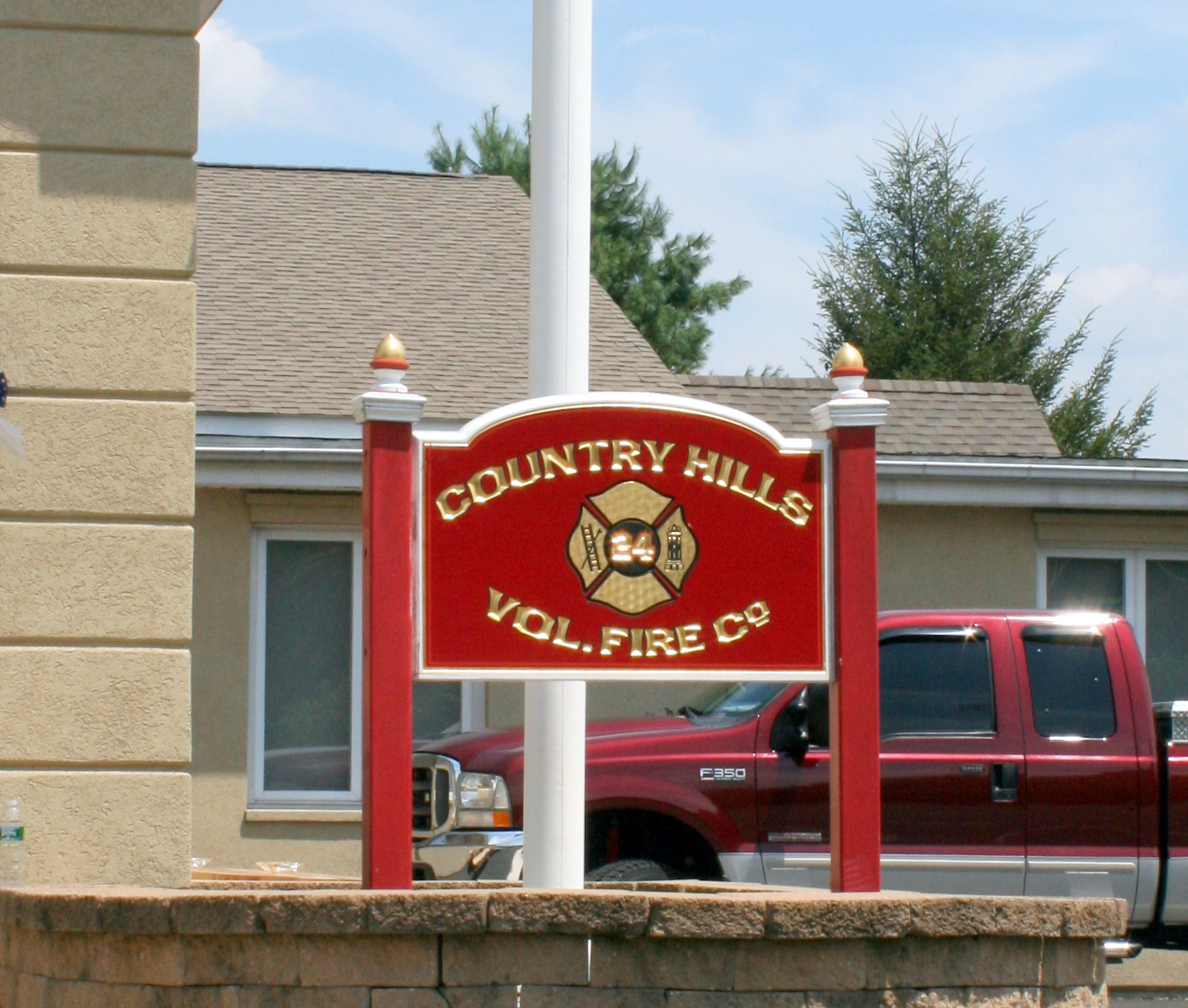
Country Hills Fire Department

Bridgewater has six all-volunteer fire companies, which provide fire suppression and assist in vehicle extrication and rescue attempts:

- Country Hills Fire Company (District 3)
- Green Knoll Fire Company (District 3)
- North Branch Fire Company (District 3)
- Bradley Gardens Fire Company (District 2)
- Finderne Fire Company (District 4)
- Martinsville Fire Company (District 1)

==== EMS/rescue ====
Bridgewater is served by five volunteer BLS rescue squads, which provide EMS coverage as well as vehicle extrication, water rescue, and other rescue services. ALS (paramedics) are dispatched from Robert Wood Johnson University Hospital – Somerset. During daytime hours, RWJ – Somerset also provides basic life support coverage for a portion of the township.

- Martinsville Rescue Squad
- Green Knoll Rescue Squad
- Finderne First Aid & Rescue Squad
- Bradley Gardens First Aid & Rescue Squad
- Bound Brook First Aid Squad

=== Transportation ===
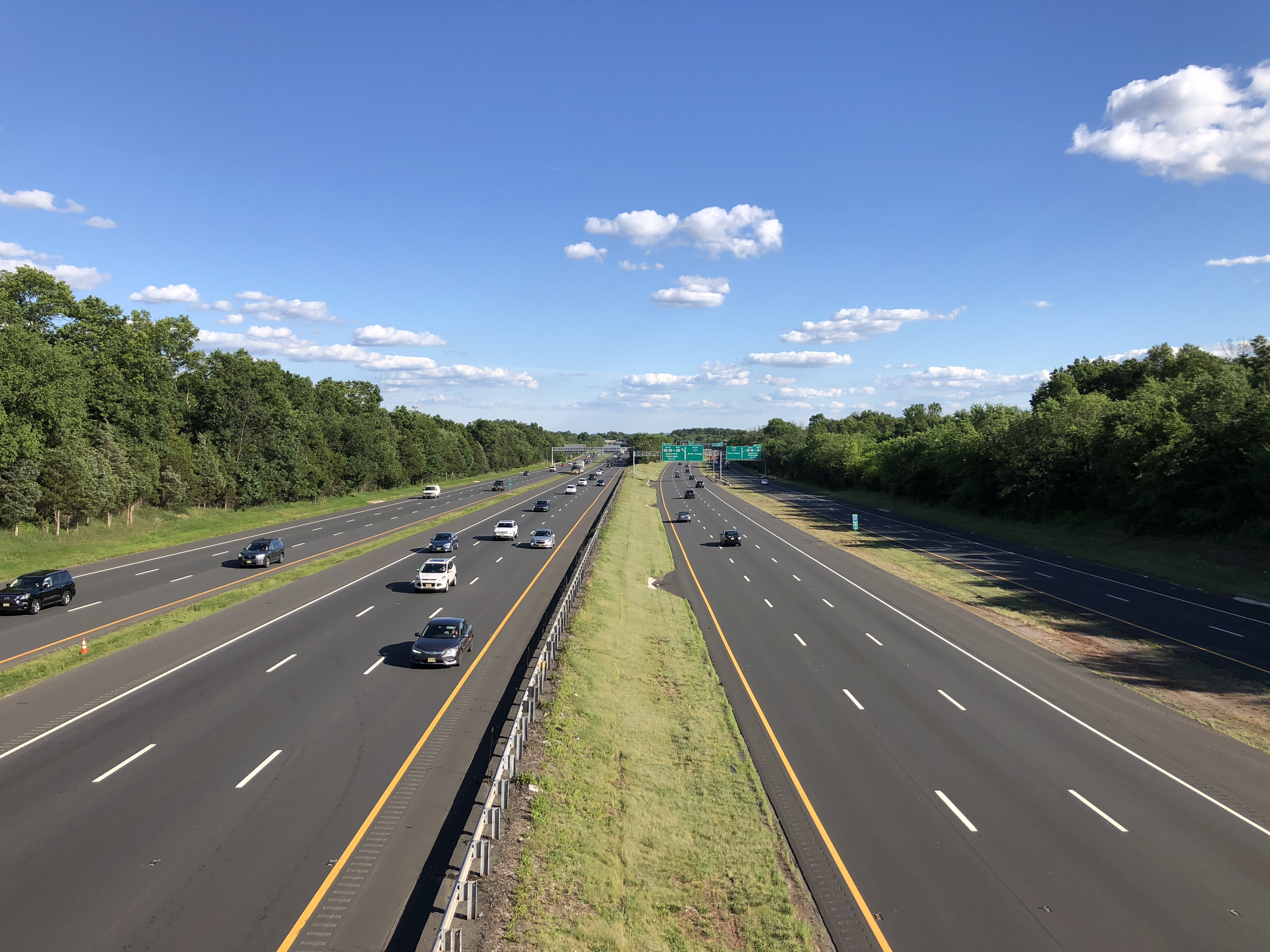
Interstate 287 southbound in Bridgewater Township

==== Roads and highways ====
As of May 2010, the township had a total of 239.75 miles (385.84 km) of roadways, of which 189.03 miles (304.21 km) were maintained by the municipality, 23.49 miles (37.80 km) by Somerset County and 27.23 miles (43.82 km) by the New Jersey Department of Transportation.

Bridgewater is crisscrossed by several major highways. Interstate 287 is the main limited-access road that passes through the township, while Interstate 78 traverses the northern part briefly without any exits. Both U.S. Route 22 and Route 28 take an east-westerly alignment, while Route 202-206 run north–south.

Major county roads that pass through include CR 525, CR 527, CR 533 and CR 567.

==== Public transportation ====
The Raritan Valley Line of NJ Transit provides service at the Bridgewater station, located on the old American Cyanamid property. NJ Transit ended service at the Finderne station, off Finderne Avenue, in October 2006.

NJ Transit bus service is provided on the 114 route to the Port Authority Bus Terminal in Midtown Manhattan, to Newark on the 65 line (Limited).

Bridgewater Township is serviced by three local airports, Solberg-Hunterdon Airport to the west in Readington, Somerset Airport to the north in Bedminster Township, and Central Jersey Regional Airport to the south in Manville. These airports are open to the public and offer charter flight services as well as flight training and other aviation-related services. They operate in all weather conditions and have instrument approaches available for use by pilots in bad weather.

Scheduled commercial passenger service is provided by Morristown Airport, located approximately 15 miles (24 km) away (about 25 minutes drive) in Morristown, and Newark Liberty International Airport, located approximately 25 miles (40 km) away (about 38 minutes drive) in Newark.

=== Healthcare ===
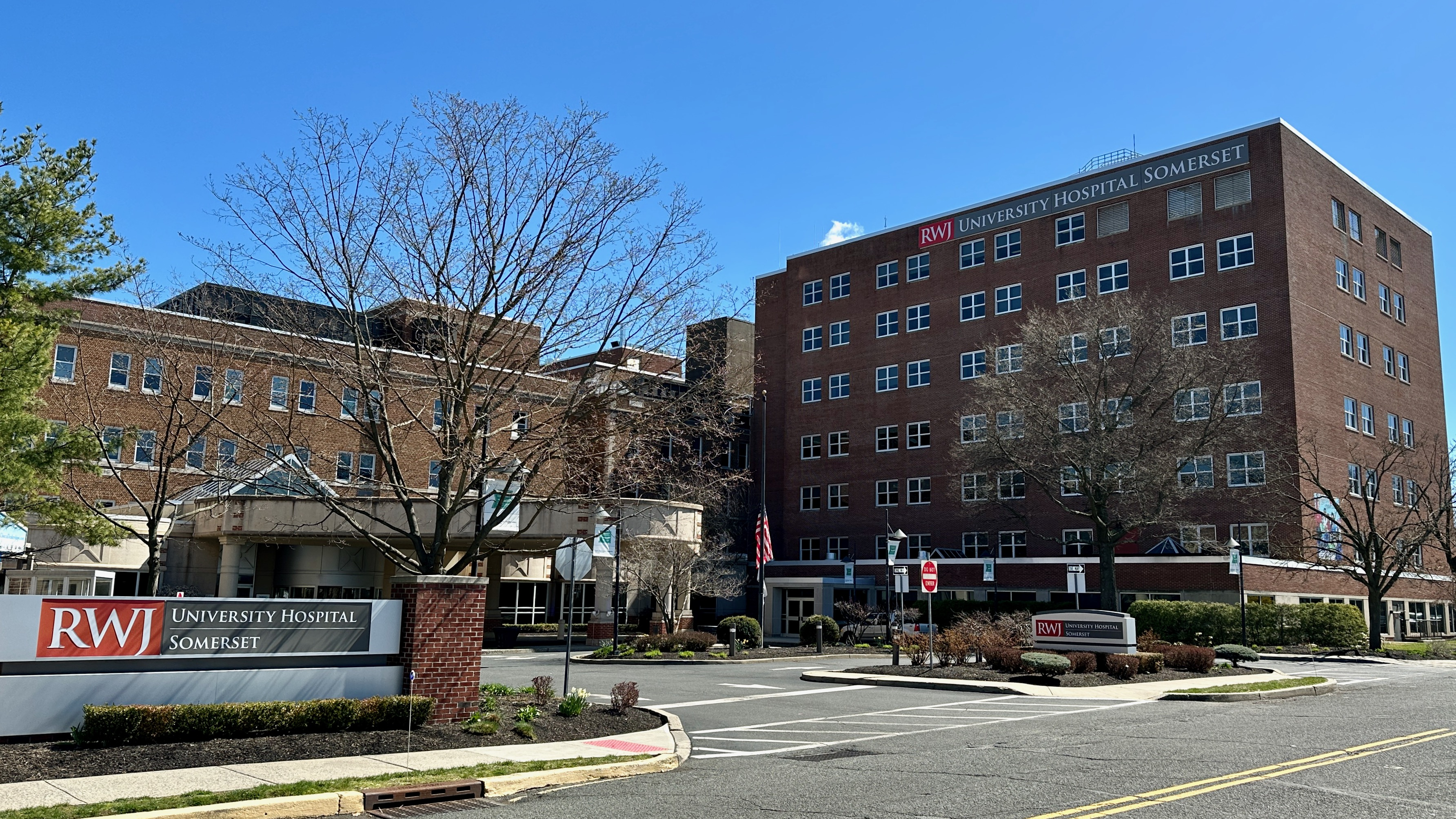
RWJ University Hospital Somerset

Located in neighboring Somerville, the township is served by Robert Wood Johnson University Hospital Somerset. Originally founded as Somerset Hospital in 1901, the medical center has grown into a regional university hospital for Greater Somerset. Since June 1, 2014, the 355-bed facility has been affiliated with Rutgers Robert Wood Johnson Medical School, the largest healthcare network in the state.

== Points of interest ==
The Van Horne House was built c. 1750 and served as the headquarters for General Benjamin Lincoln in the spring of 1777, during the American Revolutionary War, in particular the Battle of Bound Brook. Later, it served as the headquarters for General William Alexander, Lord Stirling during the second Middlebrook encampment (1778–1779). It was added to the National Register of Historic Places in 2002 for its locally significant Colonial Revival architecture from 1937 to 1944.

The Van Veghten House was built c. 1725 and served as the headquarters for Quartermaster General Nathanael Greene during the second Middlebrook encampment. The house was added to the National Register of Historic Places in 1979, and noted as representing "one of the few remaining Raritan River mansions".

Places of worship in Bridgewater include churches for a number of Christian denominations; Temple Sholom, a Conservative Jewish synagogue formed in 1966; Sri Venkateswara Temple, a Hindu temple inaugurated in 1998; and the Garden State Sikh Association Gurudwara, a Sikh temple.

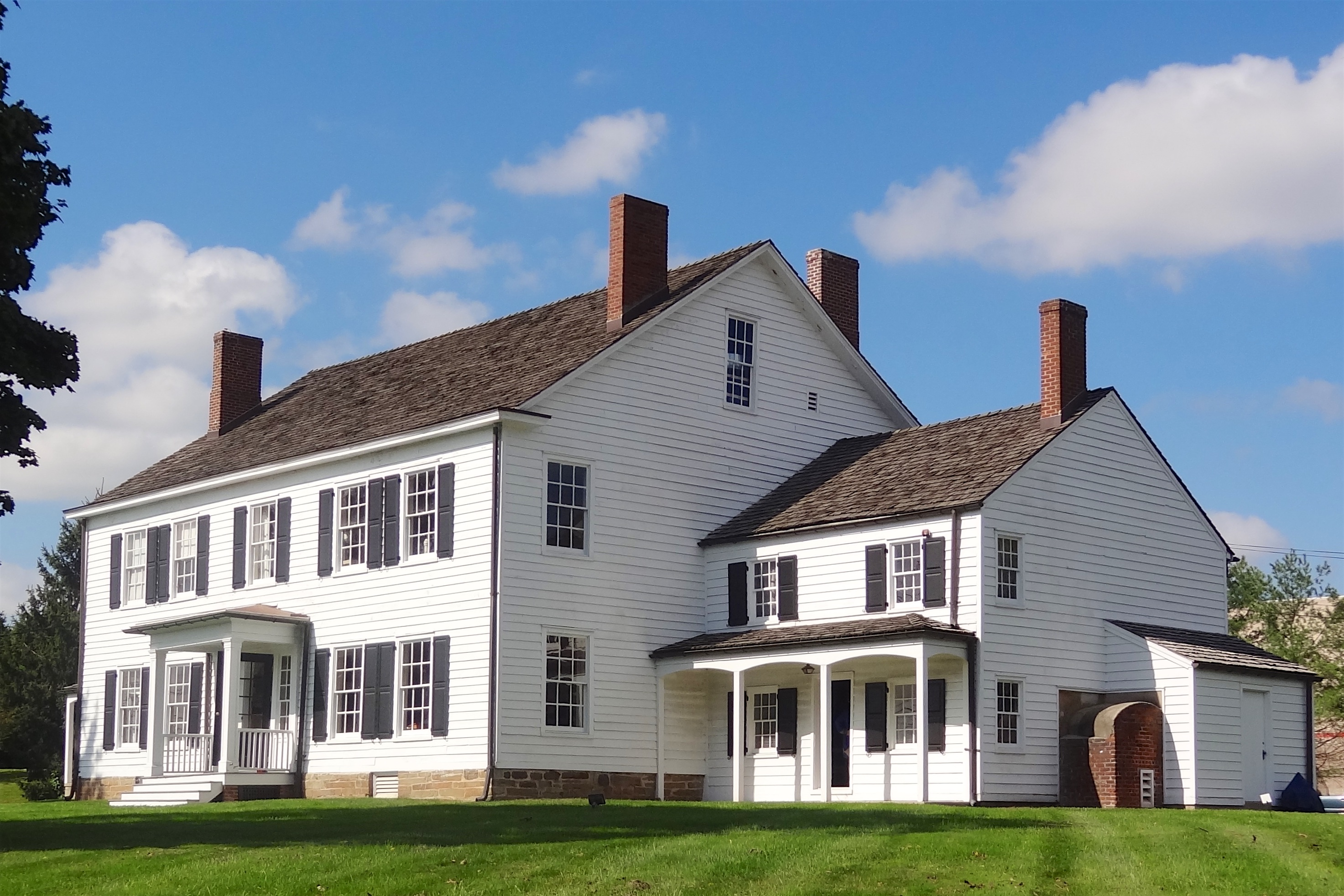
Van Horne House, 2013

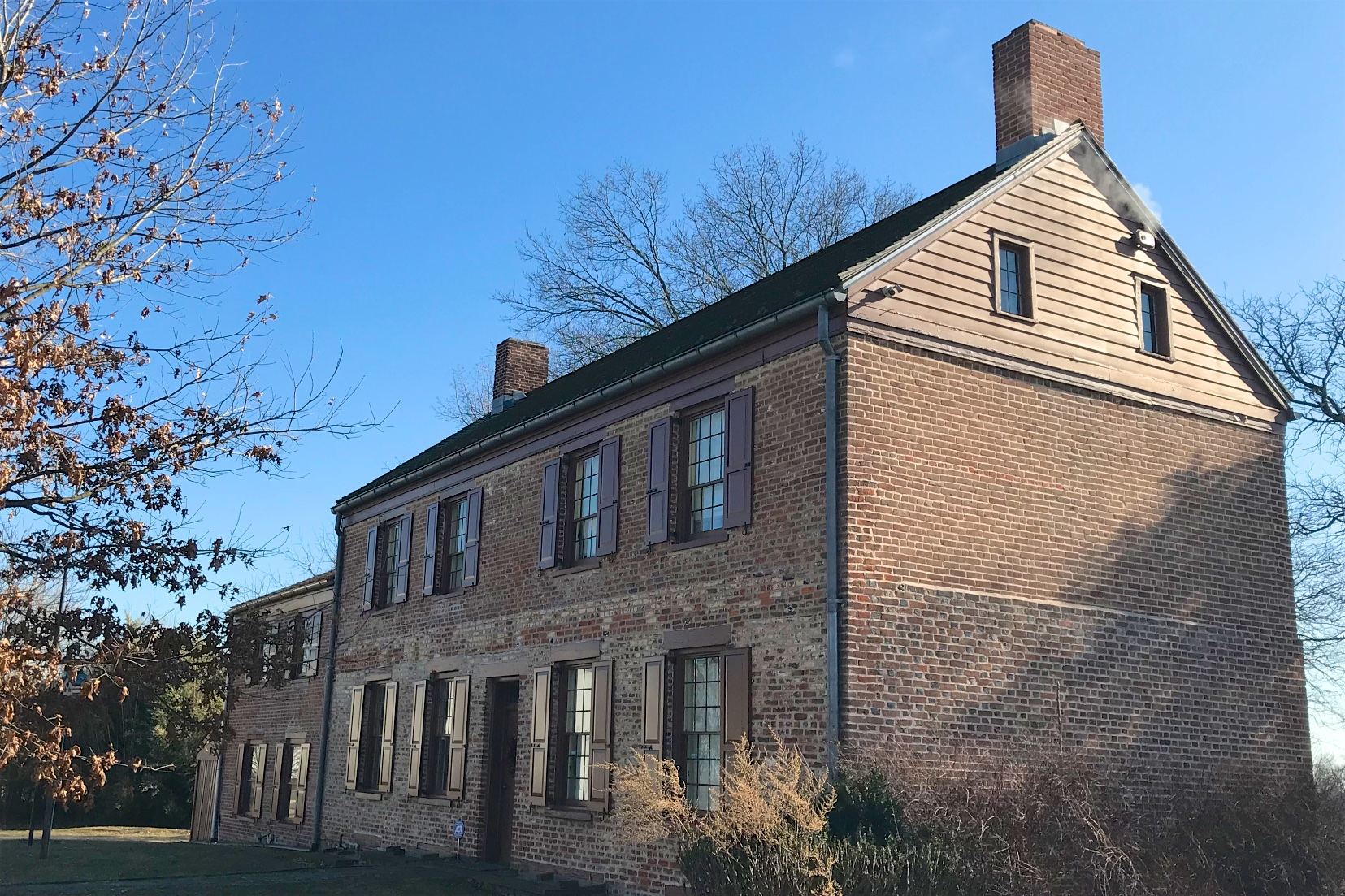
Van Veghten House, 2018

== Community ==
=== Popular culture ===
- Bridgewater is the setting for a concept album by the band The World/Inferno Friendship Society. Titled The True Story of the Bridgewater Astral League, the album talks about a gang of young people who like to get together and create all sorts of mischief.
- It was one of the filming locations for the Columbia Pictures 1994 comedy film North, which used the Bridgewater Commons Mall as the setting for a discussion between characters.

=== Superfund cleanup site ===
In August 2011, Hurricane Irene submerged the former American Cyanamid Superfund site, causing chemicals to leak into the nearby Raritan River. It could cost Pfizer up to $205 million and take a decade to clean up nearly all of the contaminated American Cyanamid site in Bridgewater—of which 560 acres (230 ha) are in the township and 10 acres (4.0 ha) are in Bound Brook—according to a company study awaiting federal approval.

=== Mosque settlement ===
In early 2011, the application was made to turn the Redwood Inn, a former inn/reception center, into the township's first mosque. The township council passed an ordinance that required houses of worship, country clubs, and other such businesses only be built on locations with access to major roads, which would directly impact the application by the mosque. The planning board immediately dismissed the application, averting state statute that would become effective on May 5 that would have made rejection much more difficult. The applicant, Al Falah Center, then filed a lawsuit against the township.

In December 2014, the case was settled out of court, with the township agreeing to purchase a 15-acre (6.1 ha) lot between Routes 202–206 and Route 287 for $2.75 million and give it to the organization to build a mosque, as well as provide $5 million paid by its insurer for reimbursement for legal fees and alleged damages. In return, the case was dropped and the township was given ownership of the original Mountaintop Road property, with the zoning ordinance law left intact.

== Notable people ==
People who were born in, residents of, or otherwise closely associated with Bridgewater Township include:

- Hank Beenders (1916–2003), early professional basketball player
- Matthew Boxer, politician who served from 2008 to 2013 as New Jersey State Comptroller
- Rob Bunker (born 1988), race car driver in the ARCA Menards Series in 2007
- Tunis Campbell (1812–1891), delegate to the Georgia State Constitutional Convention and Georgia state senator during the Reconstruction era
- Catherine Caro (born 1995), field hockey player on the United States women's national field hockey team
- Herman Carr (1924–2008), physicist; inventor and early pioneer of magnetic resonance imaging
- Barbara Cohen (1932–1992), author of children's literature who wrote more than thirty books in a range of genres, from picture books (The Carp in the Bathtub, 1972) to retellings of Biblical stories (e.g., The Binding of Isaac, 1978; David, 1995) to classical literature (Four Canterbury Tales, 1987) to young adult dystopias (Unicorns in the Rain, 1980)
- Frank DiPascali (born 1956), CFO of Bernard L. Madoff Investment Securities, LLC and key lieutenant of Bernard Madoff
- Paul Heck (born 1967), music producer and artist liaison for the Red Hot Organization and an independent sound manager
- Elena Kampouris (born 1997), film and television actress, best known for her appearances in the films My Big Fat Greek Wedding 2 and Men, Women & Children and the TV series American Odyssey
- Andrea Kane, author of romance novels
- Matt Kassel (born 1989), soccer player for the Philadelphia Union in Major League Soccer
- Andy Kessler (born 1958), businessman, investor, and author
- Paul Laird (born 1958), musicologist at the University of Kansas who has published several books, on Leonard Bernstein, American musicals, and other classical music topics
- Geraldine Laybourne (born 1947), former TV executive and entrepreneur in media and technology who led the team that created Nickelodeon in the 1980s and co-founded Oxygen Media
- Derek Luke (born 1993), professional soccer who plays for FC Cincinnati in the United Soccer League
- Saul Marantz (1911–1997), musician, inventor and engineer who founded audio manufacturer Marantz in 1948
- Ally Mastroianni, professional lacrosse player for the California Palms of the Women's Lacrosse League
- Richard P. McCormick (1916–2006), historian and professor emeritus at Rutgers University, who served as president of the New Jersey Historical Society
- Eric Murdock (born 1968), former professional basketball player who played nine seasons in the NBA
- Casey Murphy (born 1996), professional soccer player who plays goalkeeper for North Carolina Courage of the National Women's Soccer League
- William O'Brien (born 1959), racing driver who has competed in the TCR International Series
- Mark Oldman (born 1969), entrepreneur, wine expert and author
- Varun Sandesh (born 1989), actor in Telugu cinema
- Anne Sayre (1923–1998), writer best known for her biography of Rosalind Franklin, one of the discoverers of the structure of DNA
- Scott Schwartz (born 1968), former child actor who appeared in 1980s films The Toy and A Christmas Story, the latter as Flick, the boy who gets his tongue stuck to a telephone pole
- Upton Sinclair (1878–1968), author of The Jungle lived in Martinsville during the later years of his life
- Jack Terricloth (1970–2021), pseudonym of Pete Ventantonio, frontman of the band The World/Inferno Friendship Society
- Jeffrey Vanderbeek (born 1957), former owner of the New Jersey Devils
- David Wiesner (born 1956), author and illustrator of children's books and publications, whose work has won several honors, including three Caldecott Medals
- Tom Wilson (born 1967), politician who served as chairman of the New Jersey Republican State Committee from 2004 to 2009
