= Bradley Gardens, New Jersey =

Populated place in Somerset County, New Jersey, US

- Census-designated place
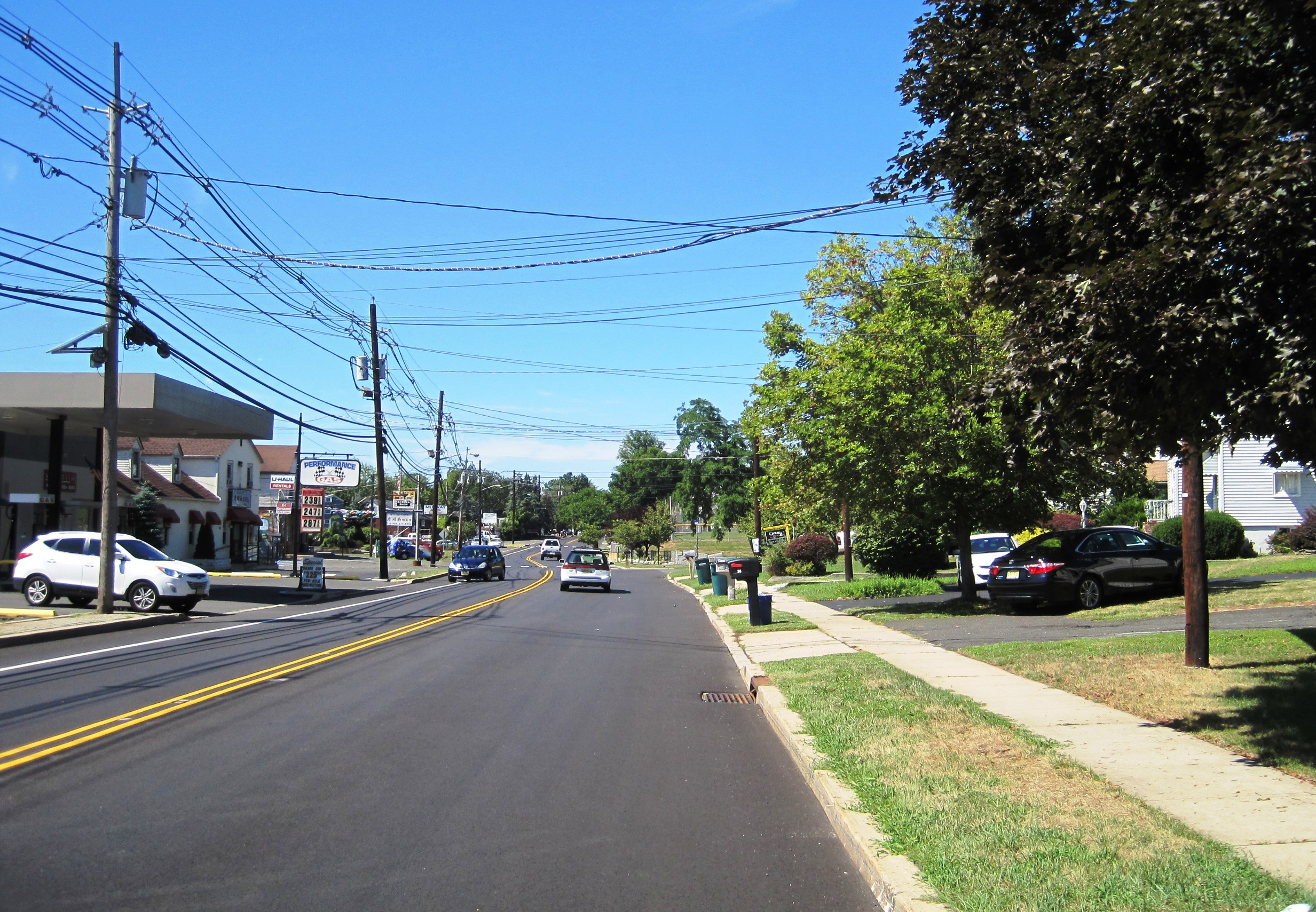
- Bradley Gardens as seen from Old York Road (CR 567)

- Location in Somerset County Location in New Jersey Location in the United States
- Coordinates: 40.572095°N 74.663381°W
- Country: United States
- State: New Jersey
- County: Somerset
- Township: Bridgewater

Area
  - Total: 4.63 sq mi (11.98 km^{2})
  - Land: 4.49 sq mi (11.63 km^{2})
  - Water: 0.14 sq mi (0.35 km^{2}) 2.80%
- Elevation: 115 ft (35 m)

Population (2020)
  - Total: 14,077
  - Density: 3,134.4/sq mi (1,210.21/km^{2})
- Time zone: UTC−05:00 (Eastern (EST))
  - Summer (DST): UTC−04:00 (Eastern (EDT))
- Area code: 908
- FIPS code: 34-07000
- GNIS feature ID: 02583971

Bradley Gardens is an unincorporated community and census-designated place (CDP) located within Bridgewater Township, in Somerset County, in the U.S. state of New Jersey. As of the 2020 census, Bradley Gardens had a population of 14,077.

== Geography ==
According to the United States Census Bureau, Bradley Gardens had a total area of 4.616 square miles (11.955 km^{2}), including 4.487 square miles (11.620 km^{2}) of land and 0.129 square miles (0.335 km^{2}) of water (2.80%).

== Demographics ==
Historical population
Census	Pop.	Note	%±
2010	14,206		—
2020	14,077		−0.9%
U.S. Decennial Census; 2010 2020

Bradley Gardens first appeared as a census designated place in the 2010 U.S. census.

=== Racial and ethnic composition ===
Bradley Gardens CDP, New Jersey – Racial and ethnic composition Note: the US Census treats Hispanic/Latino as an ethnic category. This table excludes Latinos from the racial categories and assigns them to a separate category. Hispanics/Latinos may be of any race.
Race / Ethnicity (NH = Non-Hispanic)	Pop 2010	Pop 2020	% 2010	% 2020
White alone (NH)	8,516	6,594	59.95%	46.84%
Black or African American alone (NH)	271	350	1.91%	2.49%
Native American or Alaska Native alone (NH)	11	25	0.08%	0.18%
Asian alone (NH)	4,468	5,570	31.45%	39.57%
Native Hawaiian or Pacific Islander alone (NH)	2	4	0.01%	0.03%
Other race alone (NH)	20	66	0.14%	0.47%
Mixed race or Multiracial (NH)	205	409	1.44%	2.91%
Hispanic or Latino (any race)	713	1,059	5.02%	7.52%
Total	14,206	14,077	100.00%	100.00%

=== 2020 census ===
As of the 2020 census, Bradley Gardens had a population of 14,077. The median age was 42.6 years. 22.2% of residents were under the age of 18 and 12.6% were age 65 or older. For every 100 females, there were 92.5 males, and for every 100 females age 18 and over, there were 88.8 males.

99.7% of residents lived in urban areas, while 0.3% lived in rural areas.

There were 4,948 households, of which 39.5% had children under age 18 living in them. Of all households, 64.5% were married-couple households, 10.3% had a male householder with no spouse or partner present, and 22.0% had a female householder with no spouse or partner present. About 19.0% of households were made up of individuals, and 7.2% had someone living alone who was age 65 or older.

There were 5,109 housing units, of which 3.2% were vacant. The homeowner vacancy rate was 1.0% and the rental vacancy rate was 8.2%.

=== 2010 census ===
The 2010 United States census counted 14,206 people, 4,970 households, and 3,772 families in the CDP. The population density was 3,166.3 per square mile (1,222.5/km^{2}). There were 5,081 housing units at an average density of 1,132.5 per square mile (437.3/km^{2}). The racial makeup was 63.38% (9,004) White, 2.04% (290) Black or African American, 0.10% (14) Native American, 31.49% (4,473) Asian, 0.01% (2) Pacific Islander, 1.20% (171) from other races, and 1.77% (252) from two or more races. Hispanic or Latino of any race were 5.02% (713) of the population.

Of the 4,970 households, 45.9% had children under the age of 18; 64.5% were married couples living together; 9.1% had a female householder with no husband present and 24.1% were non-families. Of all households, 20.8% were made up of individuals and 4.7% had someone living alone who was 65 years of age or older. The average household size was 2.83 and the average family size was 3.33.

28.5% of the population were under the age of 18, 5.1% from 18 to 24, 28.7% from 25 to 44, 28.5% from 45 to 64, and 9.3% who were 65 years of age or older. The median age was 39.2 years. For every 100 females, the population had 91.1 males. For every 100 females ages 18 and older there were 85.4 males.
