= Green Knoll, New Jersey =

Populated place in Somerset County, New Jersey, US

- Census-designated place
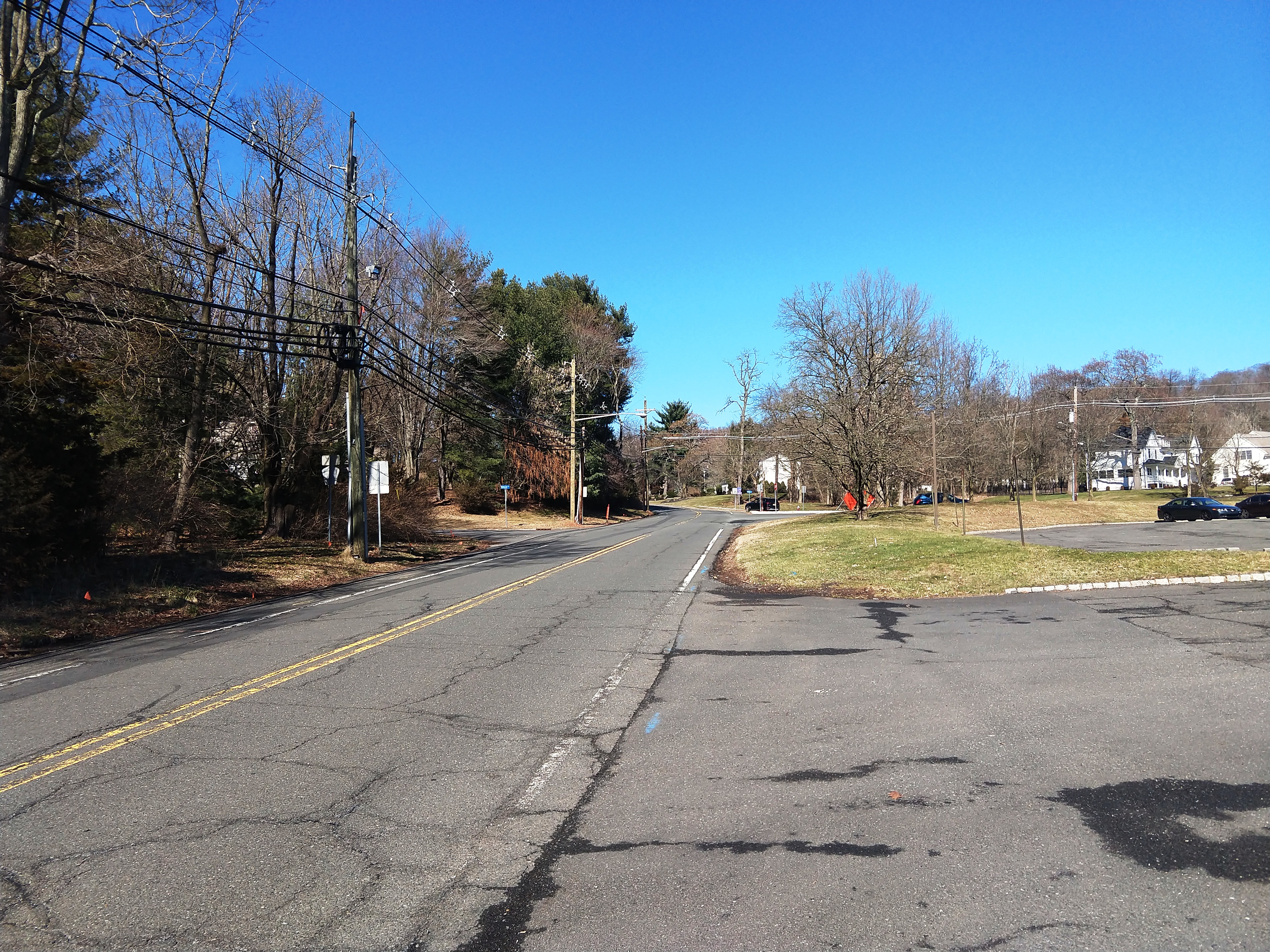
- Green Knoll along North Bridge Street near Foothill Road

- Location in Somerset County Location in New Jersey Location in the United States
- Coordinates: 40.604725°N 74.614511°W
- Country: United States
- State: New Jersey
- County: Somerset
- Township: Bridgewater

Area
  - Total: 4.64 sq mi (12.01 km^{2})
  - Land: 4.63 sq mi (12.00 km^{2})
  - Water: 0.0039 sq mi (0.01 km^{2}) 0.07%
- Elevation: 184 ft (56 m)

Population (2020)
  - Total: 6,594
  - Density: 1,422.7/sq mi (549.3/km^{2})
- Time zone: UTC−05:00 (Eastern (EST))
  - Summer (DST): UTC−04:00 (Eastern (EDT))
- Area code: 908
- FIPS code: 34-27840
- GNIS feature ID: 02583993

Green Knoll is an unincorporated community and census-designated place (CDP) located within Bridgewater Township, in Somerset County, in the U.S. state of New Jersey. As of the 2020 census, Green Knoll had a population of 6,594.

== Geography ==
According to the United States Census Bureau, Green Knoll had a total area of 4.710 square miles (12.199 km^{2}), including 4.707 square miles (12.191 km^{2}) of land and 0.003 square miles (0.008 km^{2}) of water (0.07%).

== Demographics ==
Historical population
Census	Pop.	Note	%±
2010	6,200		—
2020	6,594		6.4%
U.S. Decennial Census; 2010 2020

Green Knoll first appeared as a census designated place in the 2010 U.S. census.

=== Racial and ethnic composition ===
Green Knoll CDP, New Jersey – Racial and ethnic composition Note: the US Census treats Hispanic/Latino as an ethnic category. This table excludes Latinos from the racial categories and assigns them to a separate category. Hispanics/Latinos may be of any race.
Race / Ethnicity (NH = Non-Hispanic)	Pop 2010	Pop 2020	% 2010	% 2020
White alone (NH)	4,647	4,114	74.95%	62.39%
Black or African American alone (NH)	180	226	2.90%	3.43%
Native American or Alaska Native alone (NH)	4	0	0.06%	0.00%
Asian alone (NH)	913	1,574	14.73%	23.87%
Native Hawaiian or Pacific Islander alone (NH)	0	0	0.00%	0.00%
Other race alone (NH)	8	39	0.13%	0.59%
Mixed race or Multiracial (NH)	71	146	1.15%	2.21%
Hispanic or Latino (any race)	377	495	6.08%	7.51%
Total	6,200	6,594	100.00%	100.00%

=== 2020 census ===
As of the 2020 census, Green Knoll had a population of 6,594. The median age was 45.8 years. 20.9% of residents were under the age of 18 and 22.8% were 65 years of age or older. For every 100 females there were 88.5 males, and for every 100 females age 18 and over there were 82.4 males age 18 and over.

100.0% of residents lived in urban areas, while 0.0% lived in rural areas.

There were 2,442 households in Green Knoll, of which 31.7% had children under the age of 18 living in them. Of all households, 59.9% were married-couple households, 10.7% were households with a male householder and no spouse or partner present, and 26.0% were households with a female householder and no spouse or partner present. About 25.7% of all households were made up of individuals and 17.1% had someone living alone who was 65 years of age or older.

There were 2,543 housing units, of which 4.0% were vacant. The homeowner vacancy rate was 2.1% and the rental vacancy rate was 2.2%.

=== 2010 census ===
The 2010 United States census counted 6,200 people, 2,441 households, and 1,628 families in the CDP. The population density was 1,317.2 per square mile (508.6/km^{2}). There were 2,521 housing units at an average density of 535.6 per square mile (206.8/km^{2}). The racial makeup was 79.60% (4,935) White, 3.21% (199) Black or African American, 0.13% (8) Native American, 14.82% (919) Asian, 0.00% (0) Pacific Islander, 0.79% (49) from other races, and 1.45% (90) from two or more races. Hispanic or Latino of any race were 6.08% (377) of the population.

Of the 2,441 households, 31.1% had children under the age of 18; 56.9% were married couples living together; 7.0% had a female householder with no husband present and 33.3% were non-families. Of all households, 30.1% were made up of individuals and 19.3% had someone living alone who was 65 years of age or older. The average household size was 2.46 and the average family size was 3.10.

22.5% of the population were under the age of 18, 5.5% from 18 to 24, 20.7% from 25 to 44, 29.2% from 45 to 64, and 22.0% who were 65 years of age or older. The median age was 45.7 years. For every 100 females, the population had 85.1 males. For every 100 females ages 18 and older there were 81.8 males.
