= The Hills, New Jersey =

Populated place in Somerset County, New Jersey, US

- Census-designated place
- Location in Somerset County Location in New Jersey Location in the United States
- Coordinates: 40°39′17″N 74°37′15″W
- Country: United States
- State: New Jersey
- County: Somerset
- Townships: Bedminster; Bernards

Area
  - Total: 2.84 sq mi (7.36 km^{2})
  - Land: 2.83 sq mi (7.34 km^{2})
  - Water: 0.0039 sq mi (0.01 km^{2})
- Elevation: 540 ft (160 m)

Population (2020)
  - Total: 11,410
  - Density: 4,025.0/sq mi (1,554.07/km^{2})
- Time zone: UTC−05:00 (Eastern (EST))
  - Summer (DST): UTC−04:00 (EDT)
- ZIP Codes: 07921 (Bedminster); 07920 (Basking Ridge)
- Area code: 908
- FIPS code: 34-72635
- GNIS feature ID: 2806198

The Hills is a planned community and census-designated place (CDP) in Bedminster and Bernards townships, Somerset County, in the U.S. state of New Jersey. It was first listed as a CDP in the 2020 census. As of the 2020 census, The Hills had a population of 11,410.

The community is in northern Somerset County, in the southeast corner of Bedminster Township and the western corner of Bernards Township. It is bordered to the north by the borough of Far Hills, to the east by Liberty Corner, and to the south by Pluckemin. The Hills CDP has two sections of development: one, primarily in Bernards Township, that is atop the western end of Second Watchung Mountain, and the other, entirely in Bedminster Township, at the western base of the mountain.

Interstate 287 forms the northern and western limit of the CDP, with access from Exit 22 (U.S. Routes 202 and 206). Routes 202/206 lead north into the center of Bedminster and south through Pluckemin to Somerville.

== Demographics ==
Historical population
| Census | Pop. | Note | %± |
|---|---|---|---|
| 2020 | 11,410 | | — |
U.S. Decennial Census

The Hills first appeared as a census designated place in the 2020 U.S. census.

=== 2020 census ===
As of the 2020 census, The Hills had a population of 11,410. The median age was 45.7 years. 19.2% of residents were under the age of 18 and 16.0% were 65 years of age or older. For every 100 females there were 83.3 males, and for every 100 females age 18 and over there were 80.7 males age 18 and over.

99.6% of residents lived in urban areas, while 0.4% lived in rural areas.

There were 5,104 households in The Hills, of which 28.1% had children under the age of 18 living in them. Of all households, 48.1% were married-couple households, 15.0% were households with a male householder and no spouse or partner present, and 32.3% were households with a female householder and no spouse or partner present. About 35.6% of all households were made up of individuals and 12.9% had someone living alone who was 65 years of age or older.

There were 5,297 housing units, of which 3.6% were vacant. The homeowner vacancy rate was 0.9% and the rental vacancy rate was 4.2%.

The Hills CDP, New Jersey – Racial and ethnic composition Note: the US Census treats Hispanic/Latino as an ethnic category. This table excludes Latinos from the racial categories and assigns them to a separate category. Hispanics/Latinos may be of any race.
| Race / Ethnicity (NH = Non-Hispanic) | Pop 2020 | 2020 |
|---|---|---|
| White alone (NH) | 6,120 | 53.64% |
| Black or African American alone (NH) | 181 | 1.59% |
| Native American or Alaska Native alone (NH) | 12 | 0.11% |
| Asian alone (NH) | 3,984 | 34.92% |
| Native Hawaiian or Pacific Islander alone (NH) | 0 | 0.00% |
| Other race alone (NH) | 41 | 0.36% |
| Mixed race or Multiracial (NH) | 334 | 2.93% |
| Hispanic or Latino (any race) | 738 | 6.47% |
| Total | 11,410 | 100.00% |
