= James Linn =

American politician

Secretary of State of New Jersey
- In office 1809–1820
- Governor: Joseph Bloomfield; Aaron Ogden; William Sanford Pennington; William Kennedy; Mahlon Dickerson; Isaac Halstead Williamson
- Preceded by: John Beatty
- Succeeded by: Daniel Coleman

Member of the U.S. House of Representatives from New Jersey's at-large district
- In office March 4, 1799 – March 3, 1801

Personal details
- Born: 1749 Bedminster Township, Province of New Jersey, British America
- Died: January 5, 1821 (aged 71–72) Trenton, New Jersey, U.S.
- Party: Democratic-Republican
- Spouse(s): Mary Livingston (m. 1771, died) Penelope Alexander
- Relations: William Livingston (father-in-law)
- Children: Evelina Belmont Linn
- Parent(s): Alexander Linn; Margaret Kirkpatrick
- Education: College of New Jersey

James Linn (1749 – January 5, 1821) was an American lawyer, politician and Revolutionary War veteran who served as a United States representative from New Jersey, serving one term from 1799 to 1801.

== Early life ==
Linn was born in Bedminster Township (now Far Hills) in the Province of New Jersey in 1749. He was the son of Margaret (née Kirkpatrick) and Judge Alexander Linn, an Irish immigrant who became a prominent Judge in Somerset County. An uncle, Joseph Linn, was a prominent landowner and paymaster during the Revolution.

He pursued preparatory studies and graduated from Princeton College in 1769.

== Career ==
After graduating, he was the librarian of the college for a year, then studied law, was admitted to the bar in 1772 and commenced practice in Trenton.

He returned to Somerset County and was judge of the Court of Common Pleas; he was a member of the Provincial Congress of New Jersey in 1776.

=== Revolutionary War ===
During the Revolutionary War he served as captain in the Somerset County Militia in 1776, and first major from 1776 to 1781 under William Alexander, Lord Stirling.

=== Politics ===
He was a member of the New Jersey Legislative Council (now the New Jersey Senate) in 1777, and returned to Trenton; he served in the New Jersey General Assembly in 1790 and 1791, and from 1793 to 1797 was again a member of the State Council serving as Vice-President of Council from October 24, 1796, to October 23, 1797.

=== Congress ===
Linn was elected as a Republican to the Sixth Congress, serving from March 4, 1799, to March 3, 1801; he was not a candidate for renomination in 1800 to the Seventh Congress. He previously ran for the Second Congress in 1791.

=== Administration posts ===
He was appointed by President Thomas Jefferson to be supervisor of the revenue and served from 1801 to 1809, and from 1809 to 1820 he served as the Democratic-Republican Secretary of State of New Jersey, which "strengthened his control of the party in the state."

== Personal life ==
On May 27, 1771, Linn was married to Mary Livingston (b. 1749), the daughter of Susannah (née French) Livingston and William Livingston, the future 1st Governor of New Jersey of the prominent Livingston family. They were the parents of:

- Evelina Belmont Linn (1803–1886), who married Rev. Dr. Daniel Veech McLean (1801–1869), a Presbyterian minister and the fifth president of Lafayette College, in 1830.

Upon his father's death in 1776, he inherited his family's 664-acre estate, which included 20 slaves, in Mine Brook Valley. After his first wife's death, he remarried to Penelope Alexander.

Linn died in Trenton, New Jersey on January 5, 1821, and was survived by his widow and a married daughter. He was buried at the Lamington Presbyterian Church Cemetery in Somerset County, New Jersey.

=== Descendants ===
Through his only surviving daughter Evelina, he was the grandfather of Evelina Linn McLean (d. 1840), who died young, and Princeton graduate and lawyer, James Linn McLean (1834–1914), who married Amanda Mixsell. After her death, he married Josephine S. Dunbar (b. 1844). In 1871, McLean served a term in the West Virginia State Legislature.

== See also ==
- Alexander and James Linn Homestead

U.S. House of Representatives
Preceded by N/A	Member of the U.S. House of Representatives from New Jersey's at-large congressional district 1799–1801	Succeeded by N/A
Political offices
Preceded by John Beatty	Secretary of State of New Jersey; 1809–1820	Succeeded by Daniel Coleman
