= Alexander and James Linn Homestead =

- U.S. National Register of Historic Places
- New Jersey Register of Historic Places
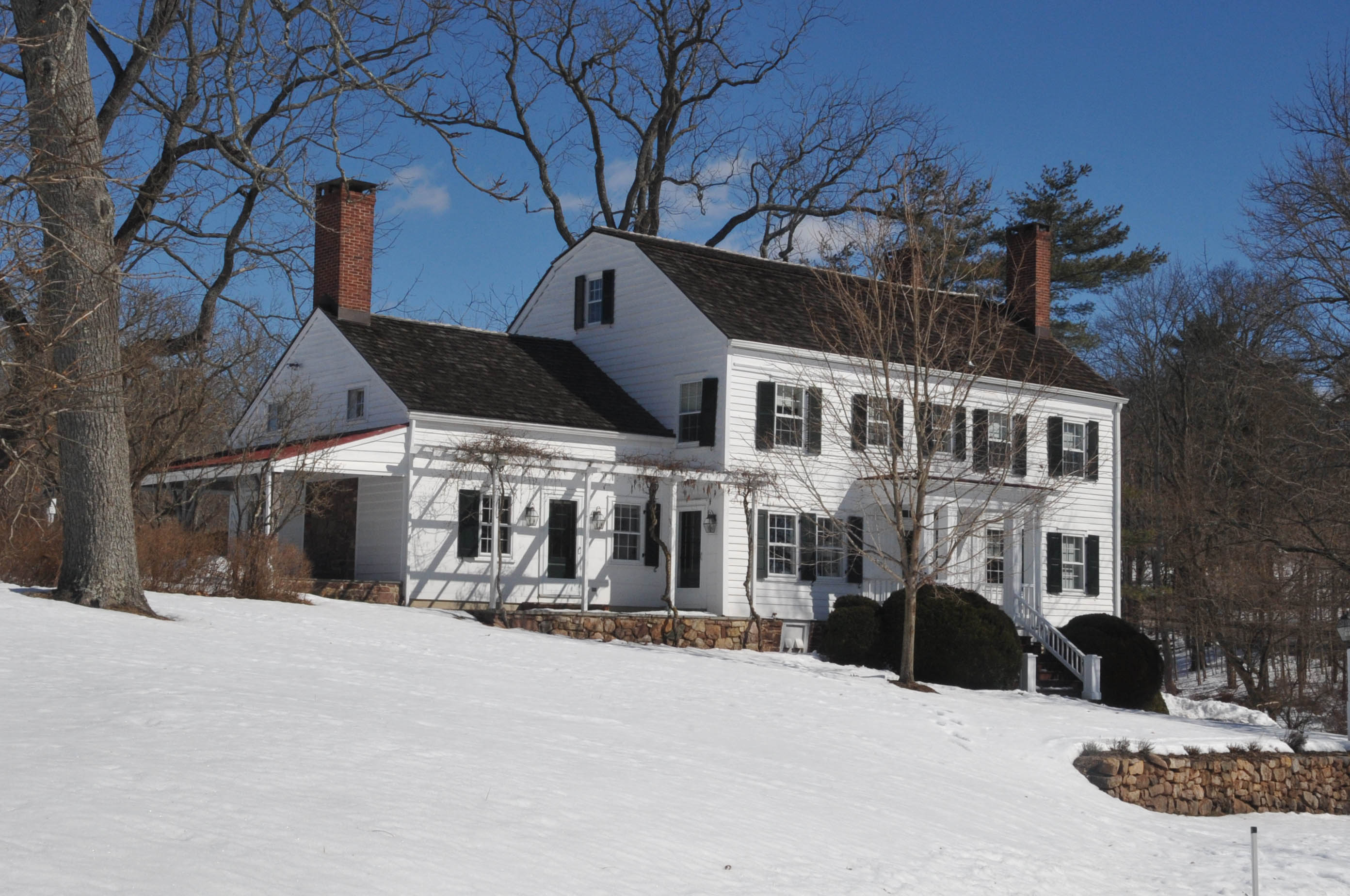
- Linn House

- Location within Somerset County, New Jersey Location within New Jersey Location within the United States
- Location: U.S. Route 202 (Mine Brook Road), between Lake and Sunnybranch roads, Far Hills, New Jersey
- Coordinates: 40°41′31″N 74°37′39.3″W
- Area: 36 acres (15 ha)
- Built: c. 1750
- Architectural style: Georgian
- NRHP reference No.: 88002057
- NJRHP No.: 2493

Significant dates
- Added to NRHP: October 27, 1988
- Designated NJRHP: June 24, 1986

The Alexander and James Linn Homestead is a historic 36-acre (15 ha) property located on U.S. Route 202 (Mine Brook Road), between Lake and Sunnybranch roads, in the borough of Far Hills in Somerset County, New Jersey, United States. Built around 1750, the Linn House was added to the National Register of Historic Places on October 27, 1988, for its significance in architecture and politics/government.

== History and description ==
Alexander Linn, a Scotch-Irish farmer, built the two and one-half story frame building around 1750. He later became a judge of the county court and an elder of the Lamington Presbyterian Church. After his death in 1776, his son, James Linn, inherited the property. During the American Revolutionary War, he served in the Somerset County Militia under William Alexander, Lord Stirling. He later was elected to United States House of Representatives for the 1799–1801 term. In 1810, he moved to Trenton, New Jersey. The house was expanded with a one and one-half story wing with Federal style.

== See also ==
- National Register of Historic Places listings in Somerset County, New Jersey
