= Leonard J. Buck Garden =

Public botanical garden and woodland garden in New Jersey, United States

Coordinates: 40.67303°N 74.622402°W

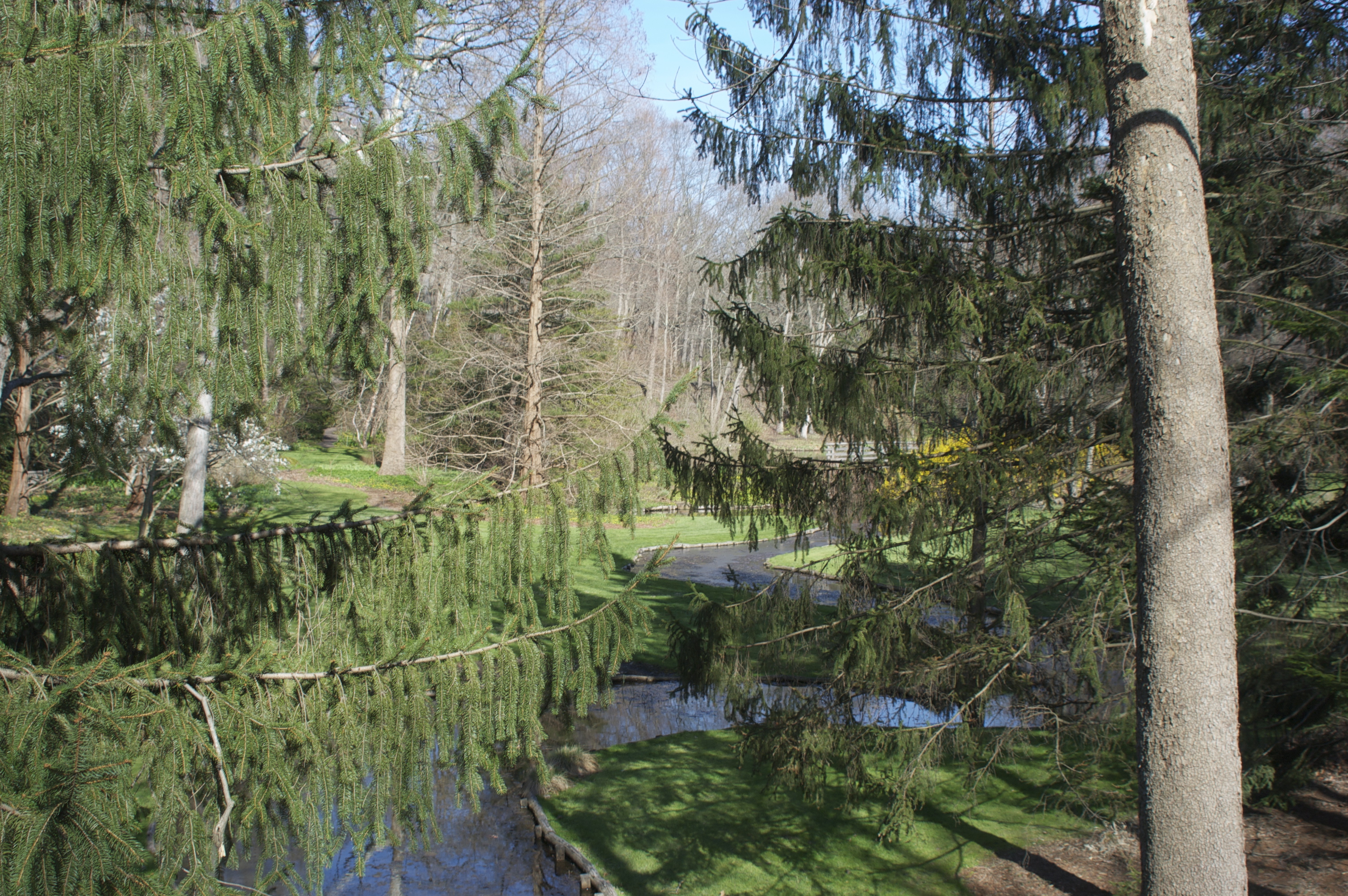
- Interactive map of Leonard J. Buck Garden
- Website: Official website

The Leonard J. Buck Garden is a 33 acres (13 ha) public botanical garden and woodland garden operated by the Somerset County Park Commission, and located at 11 Layton Road, Far Hills, New Jersey, United States. The garden is one of the nation's premier rock gardens, featuring native and exotic plants displayed in a naturalistic setting of woodland, streams, and rock outcroppings. A wooded, rocky ravine is home to numerous wildflowers interspersed among flowering trees and shrubs. Its peak visiting time is spring.

== History ==
The garden began in the 1930s when geologist Leonard J. Buck, a trustee of the New York Botanical Garden, met landscape architect Zenon Schreiber. The two created varying exposures and microclimates. The garden is sculpted from a glacial stream valley known as Moggy Hollow Natural Area, where waterfalls once cascaded, leaving behind rock faces, outcroppings, ponds and a stream. They worked by eye and proportion, with never a drawing on paper. Mr. Schreiber designed the plantings and Mr. Buck worked the rock. Their vision was to produce a woodland garden, composed of many individual gardens. After Mr. Buck's death in 1974, the garden was donated by Mrs. Buck to the Somerset County Park Commission. It opened up to the public in 1977.

== Flora ==
Plantings include aconite, anemone, azalea, beech, birch, bloodroot, boxwood, Chinese fringe tree, columbine, cyclamen, daffodils, Dawn redwood, dogwoods, enkianthus, forget-me-nots, forsythia, geraniums, grape hyacinth, heathers, herbs, hornbeam, hydrangea, Japanese maple, Japanese painted fern, Japanese peonies, Labrador violets, magnolias, mahonia, maidenhair fern, maples, mountain laurel, narcissus, oak, ostrich ferns, primroses, rhododendron, saxifrage, shagbark hickory, Siberian squill, skimmia, snowbell, star magnolia, sweet woodruff, trillium, viburnum, violets, Virginia bluebells, and wind anemones.

== Visiting ==
The garden is open to the public, a small donation is requested. Access to the lower portion of the adjacent Moggy Hollow Natural Area is possible through the garden if requested.

== See also ==
- List of botanical gardens in the United States
