= Bedminster, New Jersey =

Township in Somerset County, New Jersey, US

- Township
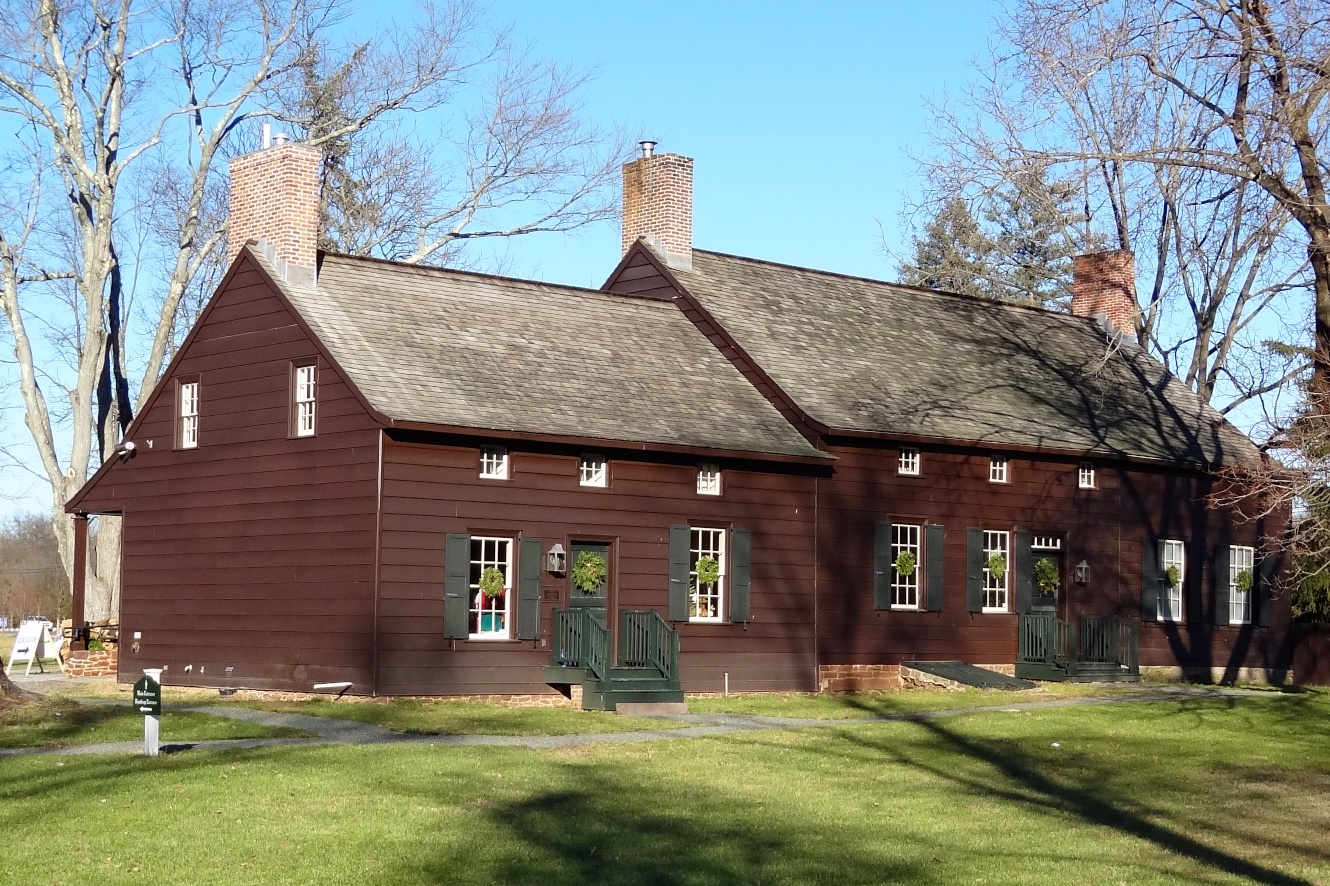
- Jacobus Vanderveer House

- Seal

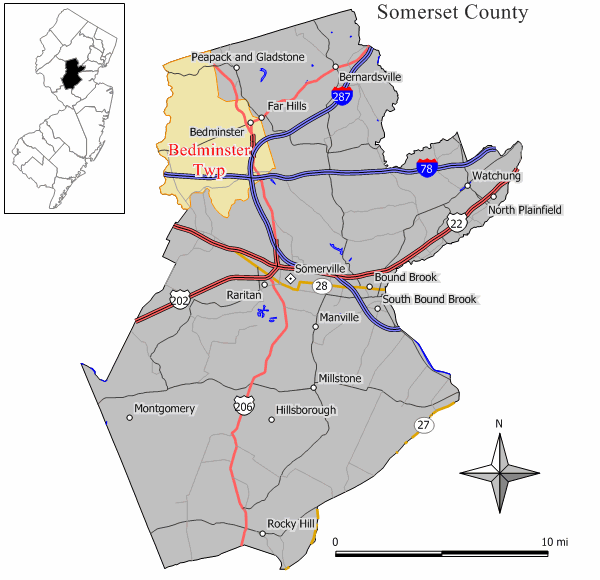
- Location of Bedminster in Somerset County highlighted in yellow (right). Inset map: Location of Somerset County in New Jersey highlighted in black (left).

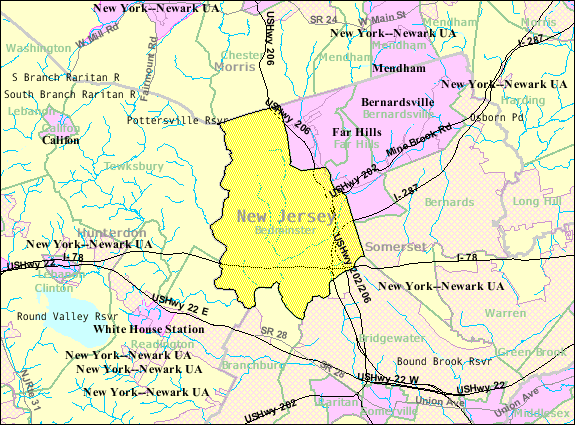
- Census Bureau map of Bedminster Township, New Jersey

- Location in Somerset County Location in New Jersey Location in the United States
- Coordinates: 40.673089°N 74.686325°W
- Country: United States
- State: New Jersey
- County: Somerset
- Royal charter: April 4, 1749
- Incorporated: February 21, 1798
- Named after: Bedminster, Bristol

Government
  - Type: Township
  - Body: Township Committee
  - Mayor: Lawrence F. Jacobs (R, term ends December 31, 2026)
  - Administrator/Municipal clerk: Robin Ray

Area
  - Total: 26.37 sq mi (68.31 km^{2})
  - Land: 26.12 sq mi (67.66 km^{2})
  - Water: 0.25 sq mi (0.66 km^{2}) 0.96%
  - Rank: 100th of 565 in state 5th of 21 in county
- Elevation: 141 ft (43 m)

Population (2020)
  - Total: 8,272
  - Estimate (2023): 8,179
  - Rank: 286th of 565 in state 12th of 21 in county
  - Density: 316.7/sq mi (122.3/km^{2})
  - Rank: 472nd of 565 in state 20th of 21 in county
- Time zone: UTC−05:00 (Eastern (EST))
  - Summer (DST): UTC−04:00 (Eastern (EDT))
- ZIP Code: 07921 – Bedminster; 07931 – Far Hills; 07934 – Gladstone; 07979 – Pottersville
- Area code: 908
- FIPS code: 3403504450
- GNIS feature ID: 0882176
- Website: www.bedminster.us

Bedminster is a township in Somerset County, in the U.S. state of New Jersey. As of the 2020 United States census, the township's population was 8,272, an increase of 107 (+1.3%) from the 2010 census count of 8,165, which in turn reflected a decline of 137 (−1.7%) from the 8,302 counted in the 2000 census. Located within the Raritan Valley region, Bedminster is part of the Somerset Hills of northern Somerset County, bordering both Hunterdon and Morris counties.

Bedminster was settled in 1710 by Dutch, German, and Scots-Irish immigrants. It was named after Bedminster, then in Somerset, England, and now a district of Bristol. Bedminster Township was created by Royal charter on April 4, 1749, from portions of the Northern precinct. It was incorporated formally by an act of the New Jersey Legislature on February 21, 1798. Portions of the township were taken on March 28, 1912, to form Peapack-Gladstone.

It is known for having one of the most historic Revolutionary War sites in the United States at what is known as the Pluckemin Continental Artillery Cantonment Site, which has been listed on the National Register of Historic Places. General Henry Knox, chief of the Continental Army artillery, was the leader responsible for building what was the country's first military artillery training academy, the forerunner to the United States Military Academy at West Point.

In 2012, Forbes.com listed Bedminster as 486th in its listing of "America's Most Expensive ZIP Codes", with a median home price of $555,243.

== Geography and climate ==
According to the United States Census Bureau, the township has a total area of 26.38 square miles (68.31 km^{2}), including 26.12 square miles (67.66 km^{2}) of land and 0.25 square miles (0.66 km^{2}) of water (0.96%).

Unincorporated communities, localities and place names located partially or completely within the township include Bedminster CDP, Burnt Mills, Greater Cross Roads, The Hills (split between Bedminister and Bernards Township), Lamington, Pluckemin, Pottersville (split between Bedminster and Tewksbury Township in Hunterdon County), Union Grove, and Vliettown.

The township borders Peapack-Gladstone and Far Hills to the northeast, Bernards Township to the east, and Branchburg and Bridgewater Township to the south in Somerset County, Readington Township to the southeast and Tewksbury Township to the west in Hunterdon County, and Chester Township to the north in Morris County.

Climate data for Bedminster, New Jersey
Month	Jan	Feb	Mar	Apr	May	Jun	Jul	Aug	Sep	Oct	Nov	Dec	Year
Record high °F (°C)	74 (23)	76 (24)	86 (30)	95 (35)	99 (37)	103 (39)	107 (42)	108 (42)	109 (43)	95 (35)	84 (29)	73 (23)	109 (43)
Mean daily maximum °F (°C)	37 (3)	40 (4)	50 (10)	61 (16)	71 (22)	80 (27)	84 (29)	82 (28)	75 (24)	64 (18)	53 (12)	42 (6)	62 (17)
Mean daily minimum °F (°C)	19 (−7)	20 (−7)	28 (−2)	37 (3)	47 (8)	56 (13)	62 (17)	60 (16)	53 (12)	40 (4)	33 (1)	24 (−4)	40 (4)
Record low °F (°C)	−20 (−29)	−16 (−27)	−4 (−20)	11 (−12)	26 (−3)	34 (1)	41 (5)	38 (3)	29 (−2)	12 (−11)	5 (−15)	−18 (−28)	−20 (−29)
Average precipitation inches (mm)	4.05 (103)	2.88 (73)	4.04 (103)	4.18 (106)	4.67 (119)	4.18 (106)	4.86 (123)	4.37 (111)	4.72 (120)	3.78 (96)	4.01 (102)	3.80 (97)	49.56 (1,259)
Average snowfall inches (cm)	8 (20)	8 (20)	5 (13)	1 (2.5)	0 (0)	0 (0)	0 (0)	0 (0)	0 (0)	0 (0)	1 (2.5)	5 (13)	28 (71)

== Demographics ==
Historical population
Census	Pop.	Note	%±
1790	1,197		—
1810	1,312		—
1820	1,393		6.2%
1830	1,453		4.3%
1840	1,589		9.4%
1850	1,826		14.9%
1860	1,996		9.3%
1870	1,881		−5.8%
1880	1,813		−3.6%
1890	1,749		−3.5%
1900	1,925		10.1%
1910	2,375		23.4%
1920	1,088	*	−54.2%
1930	1,374		26.3%
1940	1,606		16.9%
1950	1,613		0.4%
1960	2,322		44.0%
1970	2,597		11.8%
1980	2,469		−4.9%
1990	7,086		187.0%
2000	8,302		17.2%
2010	8,165		−1.7%
2020	8,272		1.3%
2023 (est.)	8,179	▼	−1.1%
Population sources: 1790–1920 1840 1850–1870; 1850 1870 1880–1890; 1890–1910 1910–1930; 1940–2000 2000; 2010 2020 * = Lost territory in previous decade.

=== 2010 census ===
The 2010 United States census counted 8,165 people, 4,100 households, and 2,021 families in the township. The population density was 313.1 per square mile (120.9/km^{2}). There were 4,349 housing units at an average density of 166.8 per square mile (64.4/km^{2}). The racial makeup was 86.41% (7,055) White, 2.06% (168) Black or African American, 0.02% (2) Native American, 8.68% (709) Asian, 0.01% (1) Pacific Islander, 1.03% (84) from other races, and 1.79% (146) from two or more races. Hispanic or Latino of any race were 6.36% (519) of the population.

Of the 4,100 households, 19.7% had children under the age of 18; 39.0% were married couples living together; 7.9% had a female householder with no husband present and 50.7% were non-families. Of all households, 44.4% were made up of individuals and 10.3% had someone living alone who was 65 years of age or older. The average household size was 1.97 and the average family size was 2.76.

17.7% of the population were under the age of 18, 4.6% from 18 to 24, 30.5% from 25 to 44, 33.2% from 45 to 64, and 14.1% who were 65 years of age or older. The median age was 43.3 years. For every 100 females, the population had 80.9 males. For every 100 females ages 18 and older there were 79.5 males.

The Census Bureau's 2006–2010 American Community Survey showed that (in 2010 inflation-adjusted dollars) median household income was $93,103 (with a margin of error of +/− $11,367) and the median family income was $124,057 (+/− $14,892). Males had a median income of $76,047 (+/− $23,293) versus $61,650 (+/− $7,236) for females. The per capita income for the borough was $66,422 (+/− $8,900). About 0.9% of families and 2.7% of the population were below the poverty line, including 3.4% of those under age 18 and 2.9% of those age 65 or over.

=== 2000 census ===
As of the 2000 United States census there were 8,302 people, 4,235 households, and 2,100 families residing in the township. The population density was 313.6 inhabitants per square mile (121.1/km^{2}). There were 4,467 housing units at an average density of 168.7 per square mile (65.1/km^{2}). The racial makeup of the township was 90.05% White, 1.75% African American, 0.11% Native American, 6.41% Asian, 0.02% Pacific Islander, 0.83% from other races, and 0.83% from two or more races. Hispanic or Latino of any race were 3.84% of the population.

There were 4,235 households, out of which 20.7% had children under the age of 18 living with them, 40.8% were married couples living together, 6.9% had a female householder with no husband present, and 50.4% were non-families. Of all households, 44.0% were made up of individuals, and 6.9% had someone living alone who was 65 years of age or older. The average household size was 1.96 and the average family size was 2.76.

In the township the population was spread out, with 17.8% under the age of 18, 3.8% from 18 to 24, 40.3% from 25 to 44, 27.3% from 45 to 64, and 10.7% who were 65 years of age or older. The median age was 39 years. For every 100 females, there were 85.9 males. For every 100 females age 18 and over, there were 82.1 males.

The median income for a household in the township was $71,550, and the median income for a family was $96,890. Males had a median income of $71,136 versus $48,589 for females. The per capita income for the township was $53,549. About 1.9% of families and 3.1% of the population were below the poverty line, including 3.3% of those under age 18 and 3.8% of those age 65 or over.

== Economy ==
Bedminster was the corporate headquarters of AT&T Corporation prior to its merger with SBC Communications; the combined company is now known as AT&T Inc. and is headquartered in Dallas. AT&T's Global Network Operations Center, which monitors traffic worldwide on AT&T's network, is currently located in Bedminster. It was also the corporate headquarters for Verizon Wireless before relocation to nearby Basking Ridge in 2006.

== Sports ==
Trump National Golf Course: owned by Donald Trump, the course features 36 holes designed by Tom Fazio, with fees to join of over $150,000.

== Government ==
=== Local government ===
Bedminster Township is governed under the Township form of New Jersey municipal government, one of 141 municipalities (of the 564) statewide that use this form, the second-most commonly used form of government in the state. The Township Committee is composed of five members, who are elected directly by the voters at-large in partisan elections to serve three-year terms of office on a staggered basis, with either one or two seats coming up for election each year as part of the November general election in a three-year cycle. At an annual reorganization meeting held during the first week of January, the Township Committee selects one of its members to serve as mayor.

As of 2026, members of the Bedminster Township Committee are Mayor Lawrence F. Jacobs (R, term on township committee ends December 31, 2027; term as mayor ends 2026), R. Colin Hickey (R, 2026), Gina Lisa-Fernandez (R, 2028), Renee Mareski (R, 2024) and William M. Rosen (R, 2028).

In 2018, the township had an average property tax bill of $6,182, the lowest in the county, compared to an average bill of $9,975 in Somerset County and $8,767 statewide.

==== Emergency services ====
Emergency services in the township are offered by the Far Hills-Bedminster Fire Department, Bedminster Township Police Department and Far Hills-Bedminster First Aid Squad.

Far Hills-Bedminster Fire Department roots back to the establishment of Union Hook & Ladder Company #1 in December 1900; The current name was adopted in 1998 to avoid confusion with other departments with similar names.

=== Federal, state and county representation ===
Bedminster Township is located in the 7th Congressional District and is part of New Jersey's 23rd state legislative district.

For the 119th United States Congress, New Jersey's 7th congressional district is represented by Thomas Kean Jr. (R, Westfield). New Jersey is represented in the United States Senate by Democrats Cory Booker (Newark, term ends 2027) and Andy Kim (Moorestown, term ends 2031).

For the 2026–2027 session, the 23rd legislative district of the New Jersey Legislature is represented in the State Senate by Doug Steinhardt (R, Lopatcong Township) and in the General Assembly by John DiMaio (R, Hackettstown) and Erik Peterson (R, Franklin Township).

Somerset County is governed by a five-member Board of County Commissioners, whose members are elected at-large to three-year terms of office on a staggered basis, with one or two seats coming up for election each year. At an annual reorganization meeting held in the first week of January, the board selects a Director and deputy director from among its members. As of 2025, Somerset County's County Commissioners are Director Shanel Robinson (D, Franklin Township, term as commissioner ends 2027; term as director ends 2026), Deputy Director Paul Drake (D, Hillsborough Township, term as commissioner and as deputy director ends 2026), Melonie Marano (D, Green Brook Township, 2028), Elizabeth Graner (D, Bernards Township, 2026; elected to serve an unexpired term) and Sara Sooy (D, Bedminster Township, 2027).

Constitutional officers, elected on a countywide basis are Clerk Steve Peter (D, Somerville, 2027), Sheriff Darrin Russo (D, Franklin Township, 2028) and Surrogate Bernice "Tina" Jalloh (D, Franklin Township, 2030).

=== Politics ===
As of March 2011, there were a total of 6,183 registered voters in Bedminster Township, of which 1,258 (20.3% vs. 26.0% countywide) were registered as Democrats, 2,238 (36.2% vs. 25.7%) were registered as Republicans and 2,683 (43.4% vs. 48.2%) were registered as Unaffiliated. There were 4 voters registered as Libertarians or Greens. Among the township's 2010 Census population, 75.7% (vs. 60.4% in Somerset County) were registered to vote, including 92.0% of those ages 18 and over (vs. 80.4% countywide).

United States presidential election results for Bedminster
Year	Republican		Democratic		Third party(ies)	
Year	No.	%	No.	%	No.	%
2024	2,575	49.56%	2,527	48.63%	94	1.81%
2020	2,440	45.32%	2,797	51.95%	147	2.73%
2016	2,258	48.96%	2,250	48.79%	104	2.25%
2012	2,424	55.43%	1,895	43.33%	54	1.23%
2008	2,431	51.97%	2,203	47.09%	44	0.94%
2004	2,674	59.24%	1,798	39.83%	42	0.93%

In the 2012 presidential election, Republican Mitt Romney received 55.4% of the vote (2,424 cast), ahead of Democrat Barack Obama with 43.3% (1,895 votes), and other candidates with 1.2% (54 votes), among the 4,406 ballots cast by the township's 6,514 registered voters (33 ballots were spoiled), for a turnout of 67.6%. In the 2008 presidential election, Republican John McCain received 2,431 votes (51.7% vs. 46.1% countywide), ahead of Democrat Barack Obama with 2,203 votes (46.9% vs. 52.1%) and other candidates with 44 votes (0.9% vs. 1.1%), among the 4,702 ballots cast by the township's 6,102 registered voters, for a turnout of 77.1% (vs. 78.7% in Somerset County). In the 2004 presidential election, Republican George W. Bush received 2,674 votes (59.0% vs. 51.5% countywide), ahead of Democrat John Kerry with 1,798 votes (39.7% vs. 47.2%) and other candidates with 42 votes (0.9% vs. 0.9%), among the 4,529 ballots cast by the township's 5,736 registered voters, for a turnout of 79.0% (vs. 81.7% in the whole county).

Gubernatorial election results for Bedminster
Year	Republican		Democratic		Third party(ies)	
Year	No.	%	No.	%	No.	%
2025	2,093	50.43%	2,036	49.06%	21	0.51%
2021	1,846	55.42%	1,467	44.04%	18	0.54%
2017	1,522	54.83%	1,185	42.69%	69	2.49%
2013	2,013	74.14%	658	24.24%	44	1.62%
2009	1,977	62.15%	928	29.17%	276	8.68%
2005	1,744	59.46%	1,103	37.61%	86	2.93%

In the 2013 gubernatorial election, Republican Chris Christie received 74.1% of the vote (2,013 cast), ahead of Democrat Barbara Buono with 24.2% (658 votes), and other candidates with 1.6% (44 votes), among the 2,752 ballots cast by the township's 6,580 registered voters (37 ballots were spoiled), for a turnout of 41.8%. In the 2009 gubernatorial election, Republican Chris Christie received 1,977 votes (61.2% vs. 55.8% countywide), ahead of Democrat Jon Corzine with 928 votes (28.7% vs. 34.1%), Independent Chris Daggett with 280 votes (8.7% vs. 8.7%) and other candidates with 26 votes (0.8% vs. 0.7%), among the 3,228 ballots cast by the township's 6,266 registered voters, yielding a 51.5% turnout (vs. 52.5% in the county).

United States Senate election results for Bedminster1
Year	Republican		Democratic		Third party(ies)	
Year	No.	%	No.	%	No.	%
2024	2,542	50.34%	2,404	47.60%	104	2.06%
2018	2,108	53.00%	1,733	43.58%	136	3.42%
2012	2,333	55.36%	1,813	43.02%	68	1.61%
2006	1,735	58.93%	1,143	38.82%	66	2.24%

United States Senate election results for Bedminster2
Year	Republican		Democratic		Third party(ies)	
Year	No.	%	No.	%	No.	%
2020	2,598	49.30%	2,608	49.49%	64	1.21%
2014	1,363	57.58%	962	40.64%	42	1.77%
2013	1,062	56.67%	801	42.74%	11	0.59%
2008	2,563	57.97%	1,763	39.88%	95	2.15%

== Education ==
The Bedminster Township School District serves students in pre-kindergarten through eighth grade at Bedminster Township Public School. As of the 2020–21 school year, the district, comprised of one school, had an enrollment of 486 students and 54.9 classroom teachers (on an FTE basis), for a student–teacher ratio of 8.9:1. Public school students in ninth through twelfth grades attend Bernards High School, as part of a sending/receiving relationship with the Somerset Hills School District, a K–12 district that also serves students from Bernardsville, Far Hills and Peapack-Gladstone. As of the 2020–21 school year, the high school had an enrollment of 819 students and 66.3 classroom teachers (on an FTE basis), for a student–teacher ratio of 12.4:1.

Somerset Hills Learning Institute, founded in 1998, educates children on the autism spectrum by utilizing the principles of applied behavior analysis. In 2024, a local ShopRite store started selling salads grown by and packed by students in the school's hydroponics career training program on a farm in the township owned by the school.

== Transportation ==
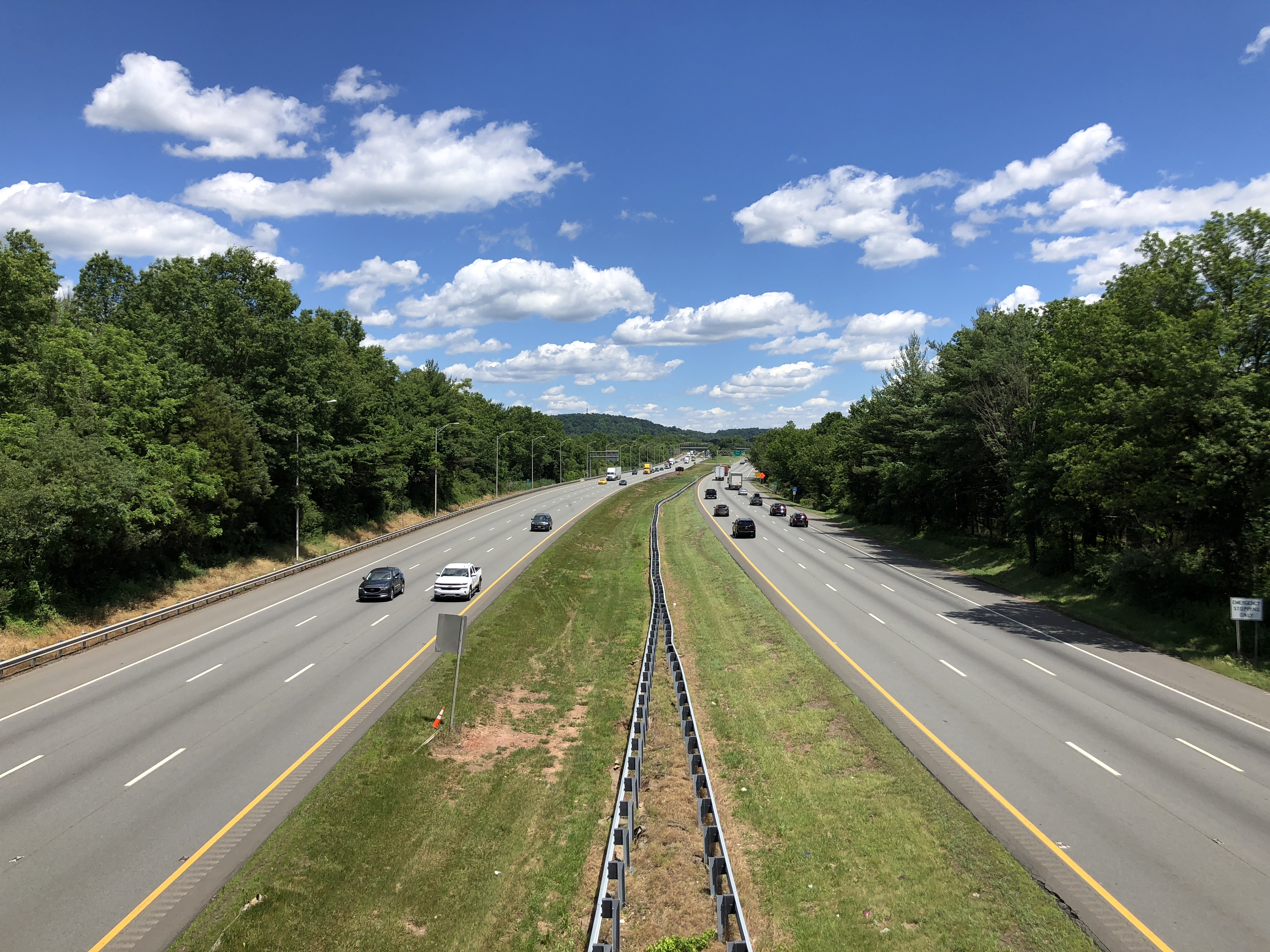
Interstate 78 eastbound in Bedminster

=== Roads and highways ===
As of May 2010, the township had a total of 68.04 miles (109.50 km) of roadways, of which 38.67 miles (62.23 km) were maintained by the municipality, 16.01 miles (25.77 km) by Somerset County and 13.36 miles (21.50 km) by the New Jersey Department of Transportation.

Bedminster is traversed by Interstate 287, which runs through the eastern section, while Interstate 78 runs mostly through the center of the township. U.S. Route 202 and U.S. Route 206 also pass through running parallel to I-287 from the Bridgewater area to Pluckemin.

Major county roads that pass through include CR 512 and CR 523.

=== Public transportation ===
The closest NJ Transit service offered is at the Far Hills station on the Morris & Essex Lines.

Somserset County operates bus service along Route 206, connecting to nearby areas including Bridgewater, Somerville, Raritan, and Hillsborough.

Lakeland Bus Lines provides Route 78 rush-hour service from Bedminster to the Port Authority Bus Terminal in Midtown Manhattan.

Somerset Airport is a public-use airport located in the southern portion of Bedminster Township. The nearest airport with scheduled passenger service is Newark Liberty International Airport.

== "The Summer White House" ==
Lamington Farm was purchased by Morgan Cowperthwaite, a New York insurance brokerage executive, in 1917. The Georgian Revival manor house was built in 1939. Cowperthwaite's heirs sold the property in 1981 to John Z. DeLorean and his wife Cristina Ferrare for $3.5 million. In 2000, National Fairways, a Connecticut-based golf course developer purchased the property at a bankruptcy auction for $15.25 million. National Fairways planned to develop the tract to include a golf club, but the plans did not come to fruition. In 2002, real estate businessman Donald Trump bought the Lamington Farm estate for an estimated $35 million.

In fall 2002, The Trump Organization broke ground on the Trump National Golf Club Bedminster on the property, into which Trump reportedly invested $45 million. The manor house became the golf clubhouse. The 535-acre tract has two 18-hole courses: the older is designed by Tom Fazio, the newer by his nephew Tommy Fazio. While president of the United States, Trump spent significant time on the property, which has been called "the summer White House" and "White House North" by Trump administration officials, though this is not an official government designation. Through the end of December 2019, Trump spent nearly a third of his time as president visiting Trump-branded properties; much of this time was spent at the Bedminster club, where he frequently golfs, and at Trump's Mar-a-Lago resort in Palm Beach, Florida (the "winter White House").

In 2007, Trump announced plans to build a mausoleum for himself on the property, including a huge obelisk in the middle of the golf course. After encountering opposition from local residents over the out-of-scale nature of the proposal, Trump floated the idea of developing a "mausoleum/chapel" on the property, but did not pursue it. In 2014, The Trump Organization filed planning applications seeking authorization to construct a graveyard on the property, including 10 plots overlooking the first hole as a burial place for Trump himself (the filings with the state said that Trump "specifically chose this property for his final resting place as it is his favorite property") and 284 lots for sale to the public adjacent to the course. In late 2014, the state, county and township granted a cemetery license for the small 10 plot family cemetery. The 284 plot cemetery plan appears to have been scrapped. Trump later indicated he might prefer to be buried in Florida instead. Ivana Trump, Trump's ex-wife and mother to Donald Jr., Ivanka, and Eric Trump, was buried in the Trump family cemetery on July 20, 2022.

== Points of interest ==
- Natirar: An estate spanning Peapack-Gladstone, Far Hills, and Bedminster that was sold by Hassan II of Morocco to Somerset County and is now administered by the Somerset County Park Commission, with 40 acres (16 ha) of the estate's 404 acres (163 ha) located in the township.
- Historic Vanderveer-Knox House & Museum: A refurbished home used by General Henry Knox during the Revolutionary War with its earliest portions dating to the 1770s, the house was purchased by the township in 1989, and listed on the New Jersey and National Register of Historic Places in 1995.
- Pluckemin Continental Artillery Cantonment Site, also known as the Continental Artillery Military Cantonment Historic Site or Pluckemin Artillery Park: Where General Henry Knox created America's first artillery training academy during the winter of 1778–1779, known as the "precursor to the United States Military Academy" at West Point.
- Trump National Golf Club Bedminster: Host of the 2017 U.S. Women's Open.

== Notable people ==
People who were born in, residents of, or otherwise closely associated with Bedminster Township include:

- Kristin Kuhns Alexandre (1948–2021), writer, journalist, author, screenwriter and producer
- John W. Beard (born 1951), politician who represented the 16th District in the Iowa General Assembly
- P. J. Chesson (born 1978), race car driver who competed in the Indy Racing League IndyCar Series
- Edward E. David Jr. (1925–2017), electrical engineer who served as science advisor to President Richard M. Nixon and as Director of the White House Office of Science and Technology
- John DeLorean (1925–2005), founder of the DeLorean Motor Company
- John H. Ewing (1918–2012), member of the New Jersey General Assembly and the New Jersey Senate
- Steve Forbes (born 1947), editor-in-chief of Forbes magazine and president and chief executive officer of its publisher, Forbes Inc., and 1996 Presidential candidate
- John Honeyman (1729–1822), alleged "spy of Washington" during the American Revolutionary War, who lived the last 30 years of his life in the Lamington area and is buried in the Lamington Presbyterian Church Cemetery
- Woody Johnson (born 1947), owner of the New York Jets and great-grandson of the founder of the Johnson & Johnson Corporation
- Thomas Kean (born 1935), former Governor of New Jersey and Chairman of the 9/11 Commission
- James Linn (1749–1821), represented New Jersey's 3rd congressional district in the United States House of Representatives from 1799 to 1801
- Jacqueline Mars (born 1939), heiress and investor who is one of the major shareholders of Mars, Incorporated
- Jane McCrea (c. 1752–1777), colonist killed by a Huron-Wendat warrior associated with the British army, whose slaying led to outrage and an increase in Patriot military support
- Sassona Norton (born 1942), painter and sculptor
- John S. Penn (1926–2013), politician who represented the 16th Legislative District in the New Jersey General Assembly from 1984 to 1994
- Zebulon Pike (1779–1813), American brigadier general and explorer for whom Pikes Peak in Colorado is named
- Mark Sanchez (born 1986), NFL quarterback who played for the New York Jets
- Erich Schwer (born 1993), winner of the 19th season of The Bachelorette
- Drew Sheneman (born c. 1975), editorial cartoonist whose work has appeared in The Star-Ledger since 1998
- Donald Trump (born 1946), the 45th and 47th President of the United States
- John Van Dyke (1807–1878), represented New Jersey's 4th congressional district in the United States House of Representatives from 1847 to 1851
- Reuben Whallon (1776–1843), politician who represented New York's 13th congressional district from 1833 to 1835
- Harrison A. Williams (1919–2001), United States Senator involved in the Abscam scandal
- Danika Yarosh (born 1998), actress who has appeared in the Showtime series Shameless and in the NBC series Heroes Reborn
