= Moggy Hollow Natural Area =

Nature preserve in Far Hills, Somerset County, New Jersey

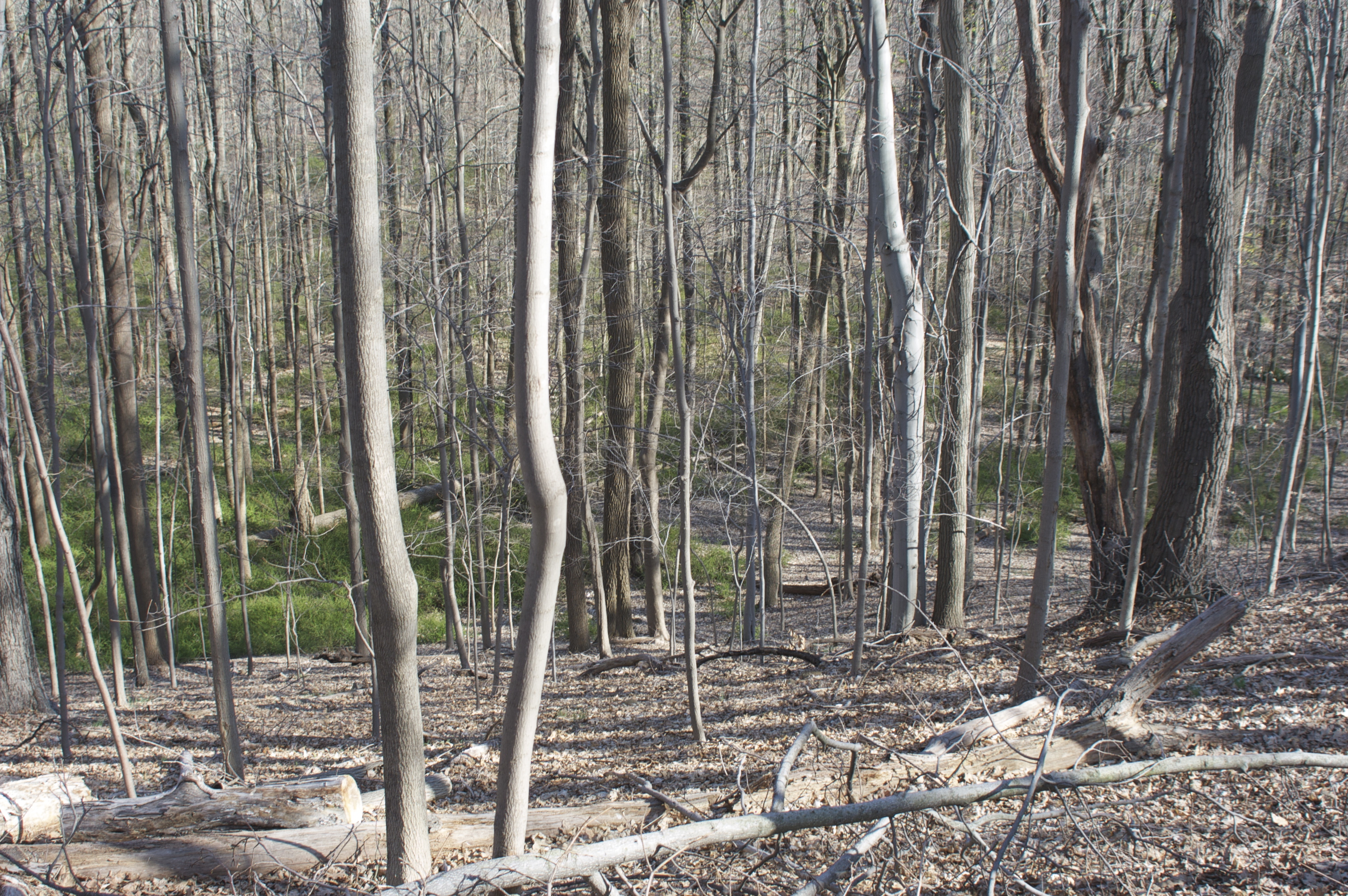

- Location within Somerset County, New Jersey
- Location: Somerset County, New Jersey
- Nearest city: Far Hills
- Coordinates: 40°40′25″N 74°36′51″W
- Area: 14 acres (5.7 ha)
- Established: 1967
- Governing body: Raritan Headwaters Association
- Website: www.raritanheadwaters.org/explore/preservesand-protected-areas/moggy-hollow/

U.S. National Natural Landmark
- Designated: 1970

The Moggy Hollow Natural Area is a 14-acre (5.7 ha) nature preserve in Far Hills, Somerset County, New Jersey, United States. As the Wisconsin Glacier advanced, Glacial Lake Passaic formed eventually rising until it found an outlet at Moggy Hollow, draining to the Raritan River. It was designated a National Natural Landmark in January 1970.

== Geology ==
The Wisconsin glacier expanded and closed off lower height gaps to the north, forming Lake Passaic. As the lake continued to grow to a maximum depth around 240 feet (73 m), it found its outlet out of the basin at Moggy Hollow at the western edge of the lake. The ledge of harder basaltic rock at 331 feet (101 m) above sea level served as a spillway for Lake Passaic carving a deep ravine out of the softer soil as the lake drained. Even as the glacier retreated, Moggy Hollow remained the main outlet due to debris left at Millburn until Little Falls and Paterson emerged from the ice. There were several post glacial lakes which formed above Moggy Hollow, bringing the ledge to its current height.

== History ==
The property is owned and managed by the Raritan Headwaters Association. Most of the current site was donated to the association on November 4, 1967, by J. Malcolm Belcher, a former mayor of Far Hills, on behalf of the Belcher family. The remainder of the site was acquired from Leonard J. Buck.

== Visiting ==
The ravine is located adjacent to and above the Leonard J. Buck Garden. Visitors can either ask to cross the Buck Garden to reach the lower portion of the ravine, or park above on Liberty Corner Road to access the top of the ledge. Portions of the hollow are steep and dangerous.
