= Pluckemin Continental Artillery Cantonment Site =

- U.S. National Register of Historic Places
- New Jersey Register of Historic Places
- Location within Somerset County, New Jersey Location within New Jersey Location within the United States
- Area: 10.2 acres (4.1 ha)
- NRHP reference No.: 08000180
- NJRHP No.: 4769

Significant dates
- Added to NRHP: March 14, 2008
- Designated NJRHP: January 17, 2008

The Pluckemin Continental Artillery Cantonment Site in Pluckemin, New Jersey, at the southern section of Bedminster Township, New Jersey, holds historic American Revolutionary War importance as the Continental Army's artillery winter cantonment during the winter of 1778–79. It was nestled on the western side of the Second Watchung Mountain just to the North of the village of Pluckemin. The major significance of the site lies with the very different picture it yields of military organization during the Revolutionary War, although some point to it as the birthplace of the American military academy, 24 years prior to the founding of the United States Military Academy at West Point.

Other terms used to reference the site include the Pluckemin Artillery Park, The Pluckemin Military Academy, and The Pluckemin Artillery Encampment. The Pluckemin Artillery Cantonment site is currently not accessible to the public. There are no buildings, no trails, and it is left as an overgrown wooded area. The only place for visitors to learn about the cantonment site is at the Vanderveer/Knox House & Museum, just to the north and west of the site on Route 202/206 Southbound in Bedminster Township, New Jersey.

== Overview ==
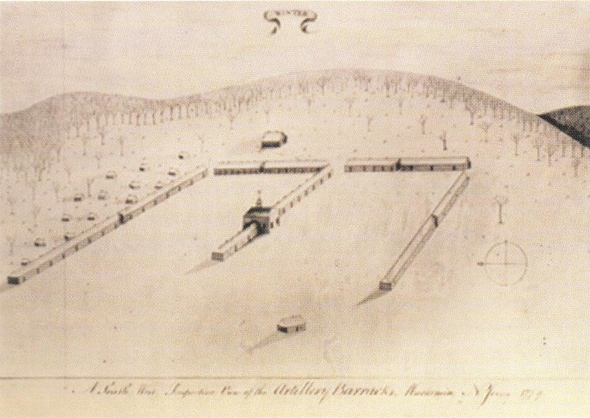
1770s drawing of the Pluckemin Cantonment from Captain John Lillie. The large building in the center was known as the Artillery Academy, now noted as America's First Artillery training academy, the forerunner to West Point.

The Pluckemin Cantonment was the artillery portion of the second Middlebrook encampment (1778–79), the seasonal encampment of the Continental Army during the American War for Independence near Middlebrook in Somerset County, New Jersey. The site includes part of the ridge of the First Watchung Mountain. Its position provided a natural fortress not only protecting the Continental Army, but also overlooking the plains towards New Brunswick where the British forces were stationed in 1777. The strategic strength of the position contributed ultimately to the success of the Continental Army.

A "cantonment" is "a group of buildings constructed primarily for the purpose of housing troops"; the term camp or "encampment" refers to troops quartered in their regimental or brigade lines. While some have used the term encampment, the national register recognizes the site as a cantonment.

The Jacobus Vanderveer house, just to the north and west of the cantonment site served as headquarters for General Henry Knox during the winter of 1778–79, when the Continental Army artillery was located in the village of Pluckemin during the Revolutionary War's Second Middlebrook Encampment. The house is the only known building still standing that was associated with the Pluckemin Artillery Cantonment. It is noted that Knox arrived at Pluckemin on December 7, 1778, and departed June 3, 1779, moving towards Pompton with the Continental Army that arrived from Middlebrook.

The area was most likely owned on a southern portion of land owned by Jacobus Vanderveer, although Jacob Eoff, a Holland native, was one of the first to settle in the area. Eoff purchased 500 acres (2.0 km^{2}) of land around 1743 known then as Bedminstertown or the Pluckemin Crossroads. The next major land owner and resident was Jacobus Vanderveer who on May 10, 1743 purchased 439 acres (1.78 km^{2}) just to the north of Eoff's property. Early deeds and wills recognize the cantonment area as belonging to the Vanderveers. The land was later purchased at auction on April 1, 1875 by Tunis Van Arsdale, then to Kate Wickoff (1891), Elizabeth Schley 1902, Hills Development Company, and lastly Bedminster Township.

== Pluckemin Academy ==
General Knox enlisted Christopher Colles as preceptor of the academy.

As noted in the Regimental Orderly Book 3 on February 23, 1779, "General Knox states "The Academy is to be opened on Monday next when Mr. Colles the preceptor will attend every day in the wee Sundy excepted for the purpose of teaching the Mathematicks & cc. ... As the Officers of the Corps will be those means have an opportunity of acquiring a more particular and expansive knowledge of the profession and making themselves better qualified to discharge the duties of their respective stations - The General expect that they will apply themselves in good earnest to the study of this so essential & necessary Branch of Science - The duty they owe themselves - a regard for their own reputation and the just expectations of their Country: The General hopes will induce every Officer to pay the closest & most diligent attention."

== Other operations at Pluckemin ==
- Military Store Department
- Laboratory - to repair and produce ammunition
- Magazine - Ammunition/powder storage
- Hospital (winter of 1779-1780)

== First Pluckemin Dig ==
Henry (Max) Schrabisch, the former New Jersey State Archeologist began his archeological efforts on the Pluckemin countryside when the term "The Dig" originated. Other phrases that were used to identify specific archeological projects at the Pluckemin Cantonment Site include the Pluckemin Dig, the Pluckemin Archeological Dig, and the Pluckemin Archeological Project. The Dig took place over eleven weeks in 1916. The excavations appear to have been completed in 1917, but no field notes or records have been found. Only a series of articles in the local Bernardsville News and a Somerset Quarterly article described the work.

== Pluckemin Archeological Project ==
Beginning in 1979, a not for profit research group was formed, combining the efforts of Bedminster Township, the Hills Development Corporation, and academics financially supported by local businesses, individuals, and small foundations. The project was incorporated in 1980 by three principals: John L. Seidel, then a graduate student at the University of Pennsylvania; Clifford Sekel, an historian and area resident who wrote a Masters thesis on the history of the site; and Anne O'Brien, a local historian and Bedminster Township Committeewoman. The Project was supported by contributions from the Hills Development Corporation and local foundations and donors.

Seidel conducted the first systematic survey of the site in 1979 and prepared a detailed map of surface features. Excavations at the site began in earnest in 1981 and continued through 1989. The excavation techniques were unusual in uncovering wide areas, preceded by careful plotting and collection of surface finds. A number of advanced techniques were employed, including the use of overhead photomosaics and a variety of remote sensing techniques. The results were reported on annually, in a 1987 PhD dissertation written by Seidel, and in subsequent articles.

In 1984 the New Jersey Historical Commission presented the Pluckemin Archaeological Project an award of recognition for helping to preserve New Jersey history and increasing public awareness of and appreciation for that history. The decade of excavation produced one of the largest and best recorded collections of Revolutionary War artifacts in the country. The picture that emerged from the work was that of an army that had found itself after the terrible experience of Valley Forge, building sophisticated barracks and workshops, and as the Pluckemin cantonment became the hub of a remarkably successful re-supply effort. Some portions of the site were subsequently built on by the Hills, although these were primarily areas that had been plowed and then archaeologically investigated. The bulk of the site is owned and preserved by Bedminster Township and patrolled to prevent vandalism and looting.

Since the completion of excavations in 1989, work on the artifact assemblage has continued. Under Seidel's direction, a team at Washington College collaborated with experts from Colonial Williamsburg and other sites to produce two generations of a "virtual cantonment" under contract to the Friends of the Jacobus Vanderveer House. The digital reconstruction is based on the extensive archaeological and historical evidence, as well as advice from architectural historians and other specialists. Work continues on the assemblage, including experimental archaeology to better understand life during the period.

== Notable guests ==
Notable visitors to the cantonment, and current and former residents of Bedminster Township (and references of interest) include:

- General George Washington
- Nathanael Greene - Pluckemin Ball February 18, 1779 with his wife
- Captain John Lillie, Commander of the 12th Company of the 3rd Continental Artillery
- Richard Frothingham - Deputy Commissary of Military Stores - possibly one responsible for choosing Pluckemin. Directed the Laboratory.
- Captain Noah Nichols and Anthony Post - Command of the artificer companies at Pluckemin
- Lieutenant Colonel Carrington & Stevens - Superintended the barracks construction at Pluckemin
- Captain McDonald
- Colonel William McDonald
- Ebenezer Stevens - Commander of Lamb's regiment.
- Samuel Hodgdon - Field Commissary of Military Stores under command of Knox while at Pluckemin
- Christopher Colles - Preceptor, led Academy activities and training at the Pluckemin Academy, Barrack Master and Storekeeper - Pluckemin
- Samuel Shaw - aide to General Knox
- John Hiwill - Inspector and Superintendent of Music for the Army (Military Band)
- Captain Cornelius Austin - Armourers supervisor after army left Pluckemin
- Henry (Max) Schrabisch papers - early archaeologist, published 1916-1917 Articles in Bernardsville News and 1917 Somerset County Historical Quarterly
- Clifford Sekel - historian and principal in the Pluckemin Archaeological Project - MA thesis "The Continental Artillery in Winter Encampment at Pluckemin, New Jersey, December 1778-June 1779," by Clifford Sekel, Jr., 1972, Master of Arts Thesis, Wagner College
- Samuel Shaw - aide to General Knox - 1847 Journals of Major Samuel Shaw - Josiah Quincy, Boston.
- John L. Seidel - archaeologist and Project Director; principal, Pluckemin Archaeological Project - Dissertation- The Archaeology of the American Revolution: A Reappraisal & Case Study at the Continental Cantonment of 1778–1779, Pluckemin, New Jersey," 1987
- Anne O'Brien - historian and Bedminster Township Committee woman - principal, Pluckemin Archaeological Project
- Frederick Wilhelm von Steuben, 1779 - Regulations for the Order and Discipline of the Troops of the United States, Phila, PA
- Lamb Papers - New York Historical Society, New York
- Regimental Orderly Book 3, 2nd Continental Army - 1779 - Feb 5 thru May 30, 1779 - New York Historical Society
- Regimental Orderly Book 2,2nd Continental Army - 1778-1779 - Nov 30,1778 thru Feb 4, 1779 - New York Historical Society
- Regimental Orderly Book 1,2nd Continental Army - 1778 - Sept 27, 1778 thru Nov 27 - New York Historical Society
- Andrew Mellick Jr.- This Old Farm book 1889
- Samuel Hodgdon Letters
- Dr. Samuel Adams Diary
- John Muller - 1780 A Treatise of Artillery - American version printed in 1779
- Lieutenant John Hills of the 23rd Regiment (British) - Map of Somerset County - Library of Congress 1781 Scale ca. 1:85,000
- US Army Center of Military History
- Pennsylvania Packet - 1779, March 6 reference to Pluckemin Cantonment and Academy

== See also ==
- Jacobus Vanderveer House
