= Christopher Colles =

Irish engineer

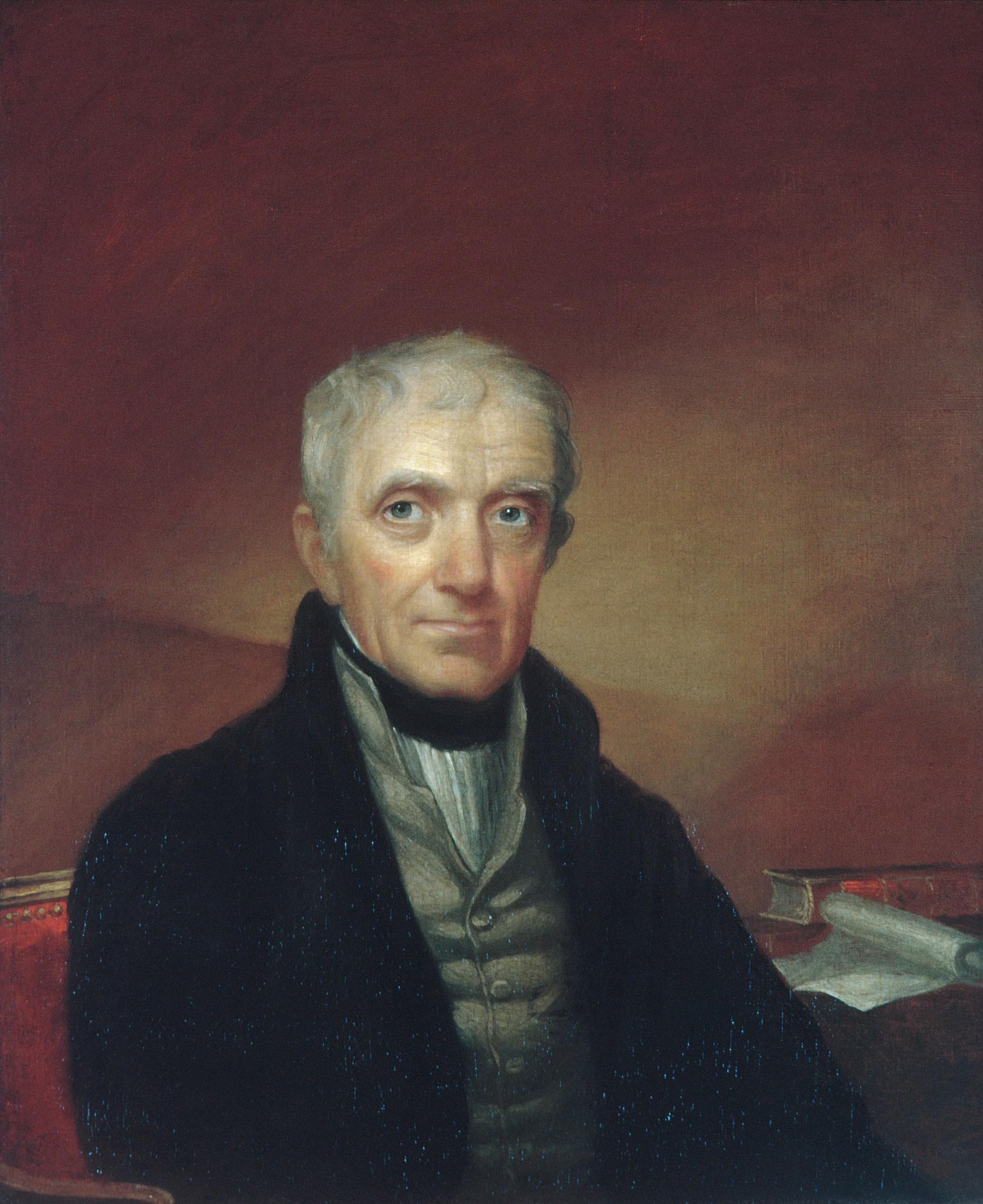
Christopher Colles, portrait by James Frothingham

Christopher Colles (1739–1816) was an Irish and American engineer and inventor, known for his work on numerous inland improvement projects, among them a water distribution system in New York City, canals to link the Atlantic seaboard to the American interior, and a road atlas of the northeastern United States. Described by his contemporaries and by historians as "ingenious" and "restless," many of his projects proved too ambitious to be realised, and few attained real success. In certain quarters, he was contemptuously described as a "visionary projector," yet he was also credited with being one of the first to conceive a waterway to the West that the Erie Canal would ultimately achieve.

== Education and early career ==
Colles was born in Ireland in 1739. From an early age, he excelled in mathematics and mechanics. After the death of his father, Colles was raised by his uncle William Colles, himself a mathematician and engineer, and later tutored by the geographer and traveller Richard Pococke. It was Pococke who helped Colles get his start, securing for him a post as paymaster on the River Nore. Colles later worked on various inland navigation and architectural projects in Limerick, for a time under the Italian architect Davis Ducart. In 1767, Colles conducted surveys of Limerick, which were later collected and published as a map. In 1764, he married Anne Keough of Dublin.

After the death of his uncle William, Colles emigrated to America, landing in Philadelphia in 1771. There he advertised his services as an engineer and architect, but when no position materialised, Colles turned to public lecturing on science and engineering. His syllabus included, among other topics, lectures and demonstrations on hydraulics, mechanics, hydrostatics, pneumatics, and geography.

Eager to do real engineering, Colles designed and built a steam engine for a local distillery, which he funded from his own pocket. The engine failed after a few trials, not because of its design but because of the meager expense Colles was able to allot to its construction. Thinking that a favourable word from the scientific establishment might help him garner funds for a more powerful engine, Colles sought a review from David Rittenhouse and the American Philosophical Society. They noted the engine's shortcomings but praised its engineer: "We are of the opinion that the undertaker is well acquainted with the principles of this particular branch of Mechanics and very capable of carrying it into execution, & therefore worthy of Public encouragement." But no such encouragement came from society. The society knew Colles and had allowed him access to its facilities for his lectures, but this may have worked against him. He was not invited to become a member, as some distrusted him as a "showman," a slight that deeply disappointed him. In 1774, Colles left Philadelphia for New York, and there he began his career in earnest, conceiving and designing the projects which would ultimately become his biography.

== Projects ==
In New York City, Colles proposed constructing a water distribution system consisting of a series of wells, a steam-engine-driven pump to extract the water, a reservoir to store it, and the piping to distribute it throughout the city. The city's Common Council thought the project was too ambitious, but nevertheless granted him funding. By 1775, Colles had begun organising his project and within months, had completed the well, the pump, and the reservoir, but at the British invasion of the city in 1776, work on the project ceased. While in New York, Colles was a frequent visitor to Anthony Lamb's shop, a maker of scientific and engineering instruments. He also befriended Lamb's son, John Lamb, a Son of Liberty, who would go on to a prominent career in the Continental Army. Colles's sympathies during this period were with the Americans, and perhaps owing to this and to his friendship with John Lamb, he thought it prudent to extract his family from the now British-controlled city. His water system was left incomplete, and eventually it was destroyed by the British.

During the Revolution, Colles was more or less on the run, first to New Jersey, and then to Kingston, NY, and possibly to Albany. During that time, he served as an artillery instructor in the Continental Army under General Henry Knox at the Pluckemin Academy. He remained in that position until Baron von Steuben was invited to take charge. It is not clear why Colles went to Kingston, but he remained there until the British burned it in 1777. Possibly during his itinerancy, Colles sought work in upstate New York as an engineer on barricades and forts. It is also not clear what motivated his constant movements, whether to stay clear of the British or to seek a living doing surveys and engineering.

As the war drew to a close, Colles petitioned in a letter to General Washington in 1783 to remove obstacles along a short stretch of the Ohio River, which would open the entire river to navigation from Fort Pitt to the Mississippi, a project Washington thought laudable but next to impossible to achieve. Owing to the "present juvenile state of the Country…and the want of resources," Washington concluded, "it appears to me that this is too early a day for accomplishing such great undertakings." He further admonished Colles to attempt "works of more immediate public utility."

In the 1780s, Colles surveyed the waterways of upstate New York and, in 1785, presented a plan to the New York State legislature to improve the Mohawk Valley waterways. In his pamphlet entitled the Proposal for the Speedy Settlement of the Waste and Unappropriated Lands on the Western Frontiers of the State of New York, Colles proposed that a series of canals and locks be constructed along the Mohawk River and Wood Creek that once completed, would connect the Hudson River and Lake Ontario, effectively uniting by water passage the Atlantic Ocean to the interior of North America. His plan called for the granting of land tracts along the route to canal workers and settlers, the land grants and the waterway improvements together guaranteeing, as his title suggested, the "speedy settlement" of the frontier. He presented the plan to the New York State legislature, which allowed for the idea so long as it was privately funded, but when Colles could not raise sufficient capital, he abandoned the project.

In 1789, Colles published A Survey of Roads of the United States, a set of strip maps, three to a page, of major routes between New England and Virginia. The Survey was the first comprehensive road atlas published in the United States, detailing roads and major landmarks—lakes, rivers, crossings, farms, taverns—that a traveller would pass and might seek out on his travels between cities and across the barely settled frontier. Many of these maps were based on the surveys he conducted in upstate New York during the war years, while others, particularly in the south, were based on the surveys of two military surveyors, Simeon DeWitt and Robert Erskine. For his own surveys, Colles used a perambulator of his own design and construction. Colles proposed selling the atlas by means of subscription to travellers—really a way of raising capital to complete the project—and made it convenient by allowing subscribers to purchase only the strips of the map needed for the route the traveller was interested in. Despite these conveniences and the practicality of the Survey, subscriptions were too few to enable Colles to continue.

== Visionary ==
As Colles grew older and his prospects diminished, his projects nevertheless grew increasingly bold and more elaborate. Though the Survey was a financial failure, its technical merits emboldened Colles to propose another atlas called the Geographical Ledger and Systematized Atlas (1794), which extended the Survey to the rest of the world. The Ledger would consist of individual sheets, each showing approximately two degrees of latitude by four degrees of longitude, at a scale of ten miles to the inch. It would also be indexed and, like the Survey, would contain references to major landmarks. The Survey, in fact, was to be incorporated into the Ledger. Its title was suggested by its search mechanism, that, through the use of the index and references, "the situation of places can be found as speedily as a merchant can find any particular account in his ledger." But again, little came of this scheme; only the introduction and a few plates survive.

Perhaps Colles's most ambitious project was the Timber Canal, a set of canals to be built entirely of timber, elevated above ground rather than dug into it. It would solve at least two problems: the difficulty of digging into the ground ("enormous roots of the trees make digging expensive"), and what to do with the "immense forests...[and] timber in abundance now constantly burning and rotting away." As was his practice, Colles put his ideas into a pamphlet, the Proposal for a Design for the Promotion of the Interests of the United States (1808). Like his other pamphlets, the Proposal was a work of the imagination, describing in meticulous detail how the canals should be designed and built, how private companies would fund their construction, and what benefits would accrue to the settlers whom he expected would "flock towards the canals." Colles planned a single route across New Jersey to start, extending from the Navesink River west to Bordentown on the Delaware River. Of all his projects, the Timber Canal was the most revolutionary, and perhaps, for this reason, the least likely to be achieved. Nothing ever came of it.

== Later years ==
During the War of 1812, Colles established and supervised an optical telegraph system to keep New York City protected from British Attacks. It was perhaps the second telegraph system established in the United States, and the first in New York City. He was commissioned a Captain in the New York Militia. Colles spent his last years in New York City, where he proposed one last scheme: a semaphore telegraph system to be strung along the Atlantic seaboard from Passamaquoddy Bay (Maine) to New Orleans. He did manage to erect a small system between Sandy Hook, New Jersey, and New York City, which was used for a time to send word to the city of incoming ships. Earlier in his career, in 1784, Colles had constructed a solar microscope and offered public displays of insects and other minute phenomena as seen on a microscopic level. In 1815, he collected and published his observations in a pamphlet entitled An Account of the Astonishing Beauties and Operations of Nature. But his career was at an end. In 1816, his friend and sometime benefactor, John Pintard, offered him a post as custodian of the old almshouse building, which was to house various New York scientific and artistic institutions. Colles was in this position only a few months before he died in 1816. He was buried at St. Paul Church in New York City in an unmarked grave.

== Legacy ==
What is known of Colles comes mostly through reminiscences of friends and rivals, through scattered tributes to his ideas over the years, and not least through his many pamphlets, which were always detailed, sometimes plaintive, occasionally poetic and prophetic. He figures as a technology pioneer in America, someone who was there at the beginning of several historical tides in American engineering history—canal building, cartography, and water systems—though his lack of success relegated him to historical obscurity. His lack of success has been attributed to Colles's being "one of those gifted men whose misfortune consists in being ahead of their times," and to the difficulties of being so ambitious in so young and unestablished a country: "[Colles] was urban in an agrarian age, and an inventor, geographer, and engineer before there were many." Colles himself attributed failure to bad luck. In a rueful self-assessment he made to his friend, and earliest biographer, John Wakefield Francis, Colles allowed that "Had I been brought up a hatter, people would have come into the world without heads."
