= Bedminster (CDP), New Jersey =

Populated place in Somerset County, New Jersey, US

Bedminster, New Jersey
- Census-designated place
- Location in Somerset County Location in New Jersey Location in the United States
- Coordinates: 40°40′50″N 74°38′44″W
- Country: United States
- State: New Jersey
- County: Somerset
- Township: Bedminster

Area
  - Total: 4.71 sq mi (12.19 km^{2})
  - Land: 4.65 sq mi (12.04 km^{2})
  - Water: 0.058 sq mi (0.15 km^{2})
- Elevation: 165 ft (50 m)

Population (2020)
  - Total: 1,244
  - Density: 267.6/sq mi (103.33/km^{2})
- Time zone: UTC−05:00 (Eastern (EST))
  - Summer (DST): UTC−04:00 (EDT)
- ZIP Codes: 07921
- Area code: 908
- FIPS code: 34-04420
- GNIS feature ID: 2806231

Bedminster is an unincorporated community and census-designated place (CDP) comprising the primary community in Bedminster Township, Somerset County, in the U.S. state of New Jersey. It was first listed as a CDP prior to the 2020 census.

The community is in northern Somerset County, in the east part of Bedminster Township. It is bordered to the east by the borough of Far Hills and to the north by the borough of Peapack and Gladstone. U.S. Routes 202 and 206 pass through the community. US 202 leads northeast 12 miles (19 km) to Morristown, while US 206 leads north 17 miles (27 km) to Netcong. Together, the two highways lead south 8 miles (13 km) to Somerville.

== Demographics ==
Historical population
Census	Pop.	Note	%±
2020	1,244		—
U.S. Decennial Census; 2020

Bedminster first appeared as a census designated place in the 2020 U.S. Census.

=== 2020 census ===
Bedminster CDP, New Jersey – Racial and ethnic composition Note: the US Census treats Hispanic/Latino as an ethnic category. This table excludes Latinos from the racial categories and assigns them to a separate category. Hispanics/Latinos may be of any race.
Race / Ethnicity (NH = Non-Hispanic)	Pop 2020	% 2020
White alone (NH)	1,019	81.91%
Black or African American alone (NH)	4	0.32%
Native American or Alaska Native alone (NH)	0	0.00%
Asian alone (NH)	67	5.39%
Native Hawaiian or Pacific Islander alone (NH)	0	0.00%
Other race alone (NH)	1	0.08%
Mixed race or Multiracial (NH)	42	3.38%
Hispanic or Latino (any race)	111	8.92%
Total	1,244	100.00%
