= Far Hills, New Jersey =

Borough in Somerset County, New Jersey, US

- Borough
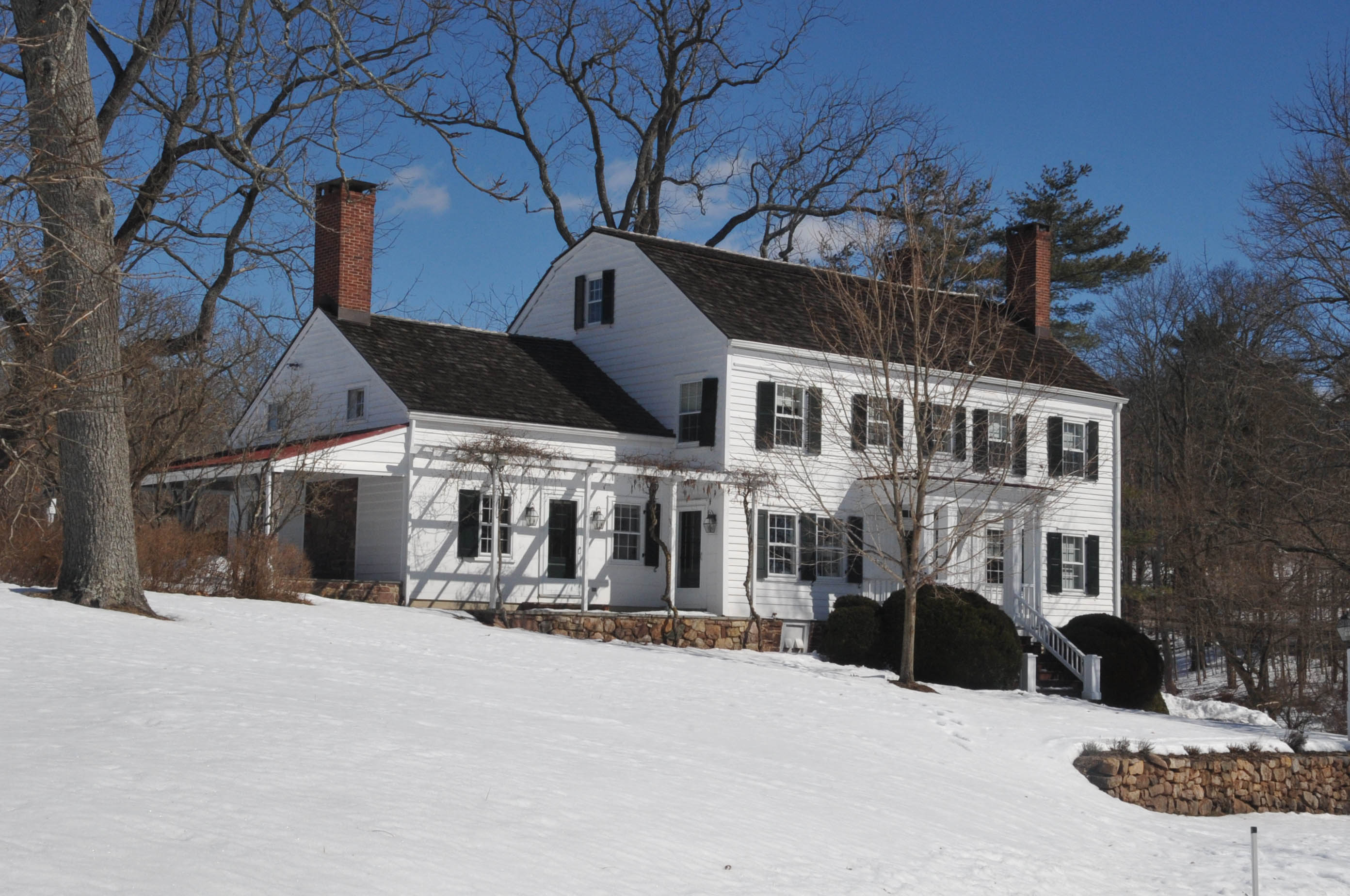
- Alexander and James Linn Homestead, listed on the National Register of Historic Places

- Seal

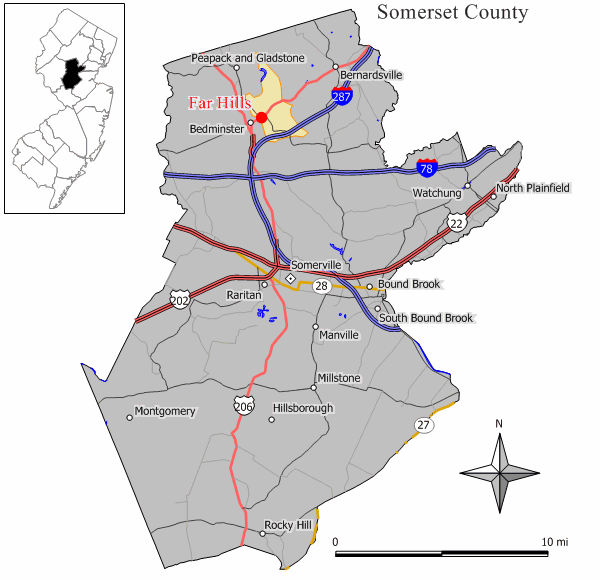
- Location of Far Hills in Somerset County highlighted in yellow (right). Inset map: Location of Somerset County in New Jersey highlighted in black (left).

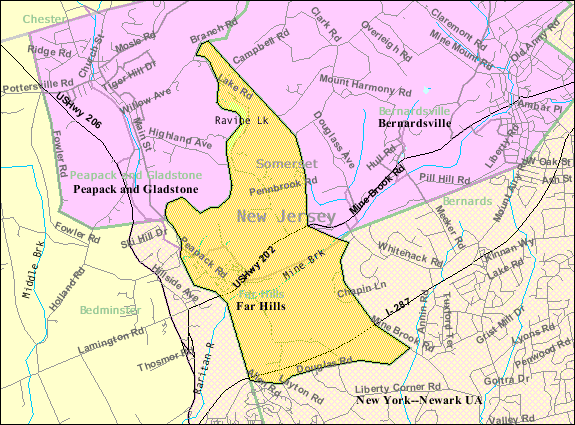
- Census Bureau map of Far Hills, New Jersey

- Location in Somerset County Location in New Jersey Location in the United States
- Coordinates: 40.690893°N 74.621537°W
- Country: United States
- State: New Jersey
- County: Somerset
- Incorporated: May 12, 1921

Government
  - Type: Borough
  - Body: Borough Council
  - Mayor: Kevin P. Welsh (R, term ends December 31, 2026)
  - Municipal clerk: Dorothy S. Hicks

Area
  - Total: 4.90 sq mi (12.69 km^{2})
  - Land: 4.85 sq mi (12.55 km^{2})
  - Water: 0.054 sq mi (0.14 km^{2}) 1.12%
  - Rank: 280th of 565 in state 12th of 21 in county
- Elevation: 213 ft (65 m)

Population (2020)
  - Total: 924
  - Estimate (2023): 914
  - Rank: 536th of 565 in state 19th of 21 in county
  - Density: 190.6/sq mi (73.6/km^{2})
  - Rank: 508th of 565 in state 21st of 21 in county
- Time zone: UTC−05:00 (Eastern (EST))
  - Summer (DST): UTC−04:00 (Eastern (EDT))
- ZIP Code: 07931
- Area code: 908 exchange: 443
- FIPS code: 3403522890
- GNIS feature ID: 0885217
- Website: www.farhillsnj.org

Far Hills is a borough in the Somerset Hills of northern Somerset County in the U.S. state of New Jersey. As of the 2020 United States census, the borough's population was 924, an increase of 5 (+0.5%) from the 2010 census count of 919, which in turn reflected an increase of 60 (+7.0%) from the 859 counted in the 2000 census. The borough is located within the Raritan Valley region.

Far Hills was incorporated as a borough based on an Act of the New Jersey Legislature passed on April 7, 1921, from portions of Bernards Township, subject to the results of a referendum held on May 12, 1921. Far Hills is a dry town where alcohol is not permitted to be sold by law.

In the Forbes magazine listing of the Most Expensive ZIP Codes in the United States, Far Hills was ranked 52 in 2010 (with median sale price of $2,067,451) and 87th in 2012 (with a median of $1,729,135). In 2018, New Jersey Business Magazine listed Far Hills at 12th in its listing of "The Most Expensive ZIP Codes in New Jersey", with a median sale price 2017 of $885,000. In the 2020 Bloomberg ranking of Wealthiest Zip Codes in the Country, Far Hills (07931) was ranked 12th, with an average adjusted gross income of over $814,000.

The 07931 ZIP Code extends beyond the borders of Far Hills into sections of other nearby Somerset Hills communities in Somerset and Morris counties including the boroughs of Bernardsville and Peapack-Gladstone; along with the townships of Bedminster, Bernards, Chester, and Mendham.

== History ==
Far Hills encompasses nearly 5 square miles (13 km^{2}) in Somerset County, encircled by the Somerset Hills communities of Bedminster, Bernardsville, Bernards Township, and Peapack-Gladstone. The borough shares a community pool, athletic programs, civic organizations, and a school system with Bernardsville. It shares a public library, a fire department and a first aid squad with neighboring Bedminster.

The borough maintains its character through 10-acre (40,000 m^{2}) minimum zoning laws whereby large private properties and homes surround a small village which was the creation of a wealthy New York businessman in the late 1800s. The beginning of rail service to nearby Bernardsville in 1870, opened the area to city people seeking a respite from the heat and hurry of urban life.

Evander H. Schley, a land developer and real estate broker from New York, purchased thousands of acres in Bedminster and Bernards townships in the 1880s. One day in 1887, Schley's brother, Grant, and his wife, Elizabeth, arrived by horse-drawn carriage to see Evander's farms. Elizabeth is said to have remarked on the beautiful vista of the "far hills," thus giving the name to the place before a village was built.

== Geography ==
According to the United States Census Bureau, the borough had a total area of 4.90 square miles (12.69 km^{2}), including 4.85 square miles (12.55 km^{2}) of land and 0.06 square miles (0.14 km^{2}) of water (1.12%).

The borough borders the Somerset County municipalities of Bedminster to the west, Bernards Township to the east, Bernardsville to the northeast and Peapack-Gladstone to the northwest.

=== Climate ===
The climate in the area is characterized by hot, humid summers and generally cold winters. According to the Köppen Climate Classification system, Far Hills has a humid continental climate, abbreviated "Dfa" on climate maps.

== Demographics ==
Historical population
Census	Pop.	Note	%±
1930	560		—
1940	574		2.5%
1950	600		4.5%
1960	702		17.0%
1970	780		11.1%
1980	677		−13.2%
1990	657		−3.0%
2000	859		30.7%
2010	919		7.0%
2020	924		0.5%
2023 (est.)	914	▼	−1.1%
Population sources:1930 1940–2000; 2000 2010 2020

=== 2010 census ===
The 2010 United States census counted 919 people, 376 households, and 259 families in the borough. The population density was 191.6 per square mile (74.0/km^{2}). There were 418 housing units at an average density of 87.1 per square mile (33.6/km^{2}). The racial makeup was 95.32% (876) White, 0.65% (6) Black or African American, 0.00% (0) Native American, 1.85% (17) Asian, 0.00% (0) Pacific Islander, 0.54% (5) from other races, and 1.63% (15) from two or more races. Hispanic or Latino of any race were 9.58% (88) of the population.

Of the 376 households, 29.5% had children under the age of 18; 58.2% were married couples living together; 6.6% had a female householder with no husband present and 31.1% were non-families. Of all households, 28.5% were made up of individuals and 8.0% had someone living alone who was 65 years of age or older. The average household size was 2.44 and the average family size was 3.02.

24.0% of the population were under the age of 18, 4.9% from 18 to 24, 19.7% from 25 to 44, 35.0% from 45 to 64, and 16.3% who were 65 years of age or older. The median age was 45.5 years. For every 100 females, the population had 93.5 males. For every 100 females ages 18 and older there were 96.6 males.

The Census Bureau's 2006–2010 American Community Survey showed that (in 2010 inflation-adjusted dollars) median household income was $125,833 (with a margin of error of +/− $29,841) and the median family income was $202,083 (+/− $85,006). Males had a median income of $177,083 (+/− $60,611) versus $76,250 (+/− $38,263) for females. The per capita income for the borough was $93,495 (+/− $19,515). About 3.6% of families and 3.7% of the population were below the poverty line, including 3.3% of those under age 18 and 4.8% of those age 65 or over.

=== 2000 census ===
As of the 2000 United States census there were 859 people, 368 households, and 253 families. The population density was 176.8 inhabitants per square mile (68.3/km^{2}). There were 386 housing units at an average density of 79.4 per square mile (30.7/km^{2}). The racial makeup was 96.04% White, 0.81% African American, 0.12% Native American, 2.10% Asian, and 0.93% from two or more races. Hispanic or Latino of any race were 3.61% of the population.

There were 368 households, out of which 22.6% had children under the age of 18 living with them, 59.5% were married couples living together, 5.7% had a female householder with no husband present, and 31.3% were non-families. 25.5% of all households were made up of individuals, and 6.8% had someone living alone who was 65 years of age or older. The average household size was 2.33 and the average family size was 2.76.

The population was spread out, with 18.4% under the age of 18, 3.5% from 18 to 24, 28.8% from 25 to 44, 32.8% from 45 to 64, and 16.5% who were 65 years of age or older. The median age was 45 years. For every 100 females, there were 88.8 males. For every 100 females age 18 and over, there were 88.9 males.

The median income for a household was $112,817, and the median income for a family was $149,095. Males had a median income of $90,000 versus $46,607 for females. The per capita income was $81,535. About 0.8% of families and 2.5% of the population were below the poverty line, including 3.8% of those under age 18 and 1.2% of those age 65 or over.

== Sports ==
The United States Golf Association has a Far Hills mailing address but is actually located in Bernards Township. The United States Golf Association Museum and Arnold Palmer Center for Golf History is located on the premises.

From 2000 through 2005 the Breeders' Cup Grand National Steeplechase returned to the Far Hills Races after a hiatus of six years. Known for the highest prize money of a steeplechase in America, the purse for the Breeders' Cup winner has been as large as $250,000 and has attracted up to 100,000 spectators. Several races are scheduled by Far Hills Race Meeting Association in late October of each year. Considered one of the premier social events of the year in the tri-state area, it is attended by as many as 75,000 people annually.

== Parks and recreation ==
- The Leonard J. Buck Garden, 33 acres (130,000 m^{2}), is a public botanical garden operated by the Somerset County Park Commission, and located at 11 Layton Road. It is open daily; a small fee is requested.
- Moggy Hollow Natural Area is a National Natural Landmark adjacent to the Buck Garden.
- Natirar is an estate spanning 491 acres (1.99 km^{2}) in Far Hills, Peapack-Gladstone and Bedminster that was sold in 2003 by Mohammed VI, King of Morocco, to the Somerset County Park Commission.

== Government ==
=== Local government ===
Far Hills is governed under the borough form of New Jersey municipal government, which is used in 218 municipalities (of the 564) statewide, making it the most common form of government in New Jersey. The governing body is comprised of the mayor and the borough council, with all positions elected at-large on a partisan basis as part of the November general election. A mayor is elected directly by the voters to a four-year term of office. The borough council includes six members elected to serve three-year terms on a staggered basis, with two seats coming up for election each year in a three-year cycle. The borough form of government used by Far Hills is a "weak mayor / strong council" government in which council members act as the legislative body with the mayor presiding at meetings and voting only in the event of a tie. The mayor can veto ordinances subject to an override by a two-thirds majority vote of the council. The mayor makes committee and liaison assignments for council members, and most appointments are made by the mayor with the advice and consent of the council.

As of 2024, the mayor of Far Hills is Republican Kevin Welsh, whose term of office ends on December 31, 2026. Members of the Far Hills Borough Council are Council President David P. Karner (R, 2025), Joseph E. Carty (R, 2026), Mary Chimenti (R, 2024), Peter J. Cocoziello Jr. (R, 2024; appointed to serve an unexpired term), Richard L. Rinzler (R, 2025) and Charles P. Schwester (R, 2026) and Kevin Welsh (R, 2024).

Peter Cocoziello was appointed in January 2023 to fill the seat expiring in December 2024 that had been held by Kevin Walsh until he stepped down to take office as mayor. Cocoziello served on an interim basis until the November 2023 general election, when voters chose him to serve the balance of the term of office.

In November 2019, the borough council selected Ted McLean to fill the weeks remaining in the seat expiring in December 2019 that had been held by David R. Surks until he resigned from office earlier that month. Surks was re-elected in the November 2019 general election In January 2020, McLean was appointed to fill Surks' term expiring in December 2022 and will serve on an interim basis until the November 2020 general election.

=== Emergency services ===
Emergency services in the borough are offered by the Far Hills-Bedminster Fire Department, Far Hills Police Department, and Far Hills-Bedminster First Aid Squad. Far Hills-Bedminster Fire Department roots back to the establishment of Union Hook & Ladder Company #1 in December 1900; The current name was adopted in 1998 to avoid confusion with other departments with similar names.

=== Federal, state and county representation ===
Far Hills is located in the 7th Congressional District and is part of New Jersey's 21st state legislative district.

For the 119th United States Congress, New Jersey's 7th congressional district is represented by Thomas Kean Jr. (R, Westfield). New Jersey is represented in the United States Senate by Democrats Cory Booker (Newark, term ends 2027) and Andy Kim (Moorestown, term ends 2031).

For the 2026–2027 session, the 21st legislative district of the New Jersey Legislature is represented in the State Senate by Jon Bramnick (R, Westfield) and in the General Assembly by Vincent Kearney (D, Garwood) and Andrew Macurdy (D, Summit).

Somerset County is governed by a five-member Board of County Commissioners, whose members are elected at-large to three-year terms of office on a staggered basis, with one or two seats coming up for election each year. At an annual reorganization meeting held in the first week of January, the board selects a Director and deputy director from among its members. As of 2025, Somerset County's County Commissioners are Director Shanel Robinson (D, Franklin Township, term as commissioner ends 2027; term as director ends 2026), Deputy Director Paul Drake (D, Hillsborough Township, term as commissioner and as deputy director ends 2026), Melonie Marano (D, Green Brook Township, 2028), Elizabeth Graner (D, Bernards Township, 2026; elected to serve an unexpired term) and Sara Sooy (D, Bedminster Township, 2027).

Constitutional officers, elected on a countywide basis are Clerk Steve Peter (D, Somerville, 2027), Sheriff Darrin Russo (D, Franklin Township, 2028) and Surrogate Bernice "Tina" Jalloh (D, Franklin Township, 2030).

=== Politics ===
As of March 2011, there were a total of 748 registered voters in Far Hills, of which 97 (13.0% vs. 26.0% countywide) were registered as Democrats, 382 (51.1% vs. 25.7%) were registered as Republicans and 268 (35.8% vs. 48.2%) were registered as Unaffiliated. There was one voter registered to another party. Among the borough's 2010 Census population, 81.4% (vs. 60.4% in Somerset County) were registered to vote, including 107.2% of those ages 18 and over (vs. 80.4% countywide).

United States presidential election results for Far Hills
Year	Republican		Democratic		Third party(ies)	
Year	No.	%	No.	%	No.	%
2024	349	58.07%	237	39.43%	15	2.50%
2020	334	51.70%	302	46.75%	10	1.55%
2016	313	56.81%	224	40.65%	14	2.54%
2012	348	71.02%	137	27.96%	5	1.02%
2008	355	63.85%	196	35.25%	5	0.90%
2004	342	67.86%	160	31.75%	2	0.40%
2000	276	67.32%	113	27.56%	21	5.12%
1996	253	68.01%	106	28.49%	13	3.49%
1992	221	69.94%	95	30.06%	0	0.00%
1988	292	78.71%	79	21.29%	0	0.00%

In the 2012 presidential election, Republican Mitt Romney received 70.6% of the vote (348 cast), ahead of Democrat Barack Obama with 27.8% (137 votes), and other candidates with 1.0% (5 votes), among the 493 ballots cast by the borough's 793 registered voters (3 ballots were spoiled), for a turnout of 62.2%. In the 2008 presidential election, Republican John McCain received 355 votes (63.1% vs. 46.1% countywide), ahead of Democrat Barack Obama with 196 votes (34.8% vs. 52.1%) and other candidates with 5 votes (0.9% vs. 1.1%), among the 563 ballots cast by the borough's 726 registered voters, for a turnout of 77.5% (vs. 78.7% in Somerset County). In the 2004 presidential election, Republican George W. Bush received 342 votes (67.7% vs. 51.5% countywide), ahead of Democrat John Kerry with 160 votes (31.7% vs. 47.2%) and other candidates with 2 votes (0.4% vs. 0.9%), among the 505 ballots cast by the borough's 636 registered voters, for a turnout of 79.4% (vs. 81.7% in the whole county).

Gubernatorial election results for Far Hills
Year	Republican		Democratic		Third party(ies)	
Year	No.	%	No.	%	No.	%
2025	306	59.77%	201	39.26%	5	0.98%
2021	273	63.34%	153	35.50%	5	1.16%
2017	218	64.88%	113	33.63%	5	1.49%
2013	275	84.88%	42	12.96%	7	2.16%
2009	282	69.80%	65	16.09%	57	14.11%
2005	245	74.24%	77	23.33%	8	2.42%

In the 2013 gubernatorial election, Republican Chris Christie received 84.9% of the vote (275 cast), ahead of Democrat Barbara Buono with 13.0% (42 votes), and other candidates with 2.2% (7 votes), among the 324 ballots cast by the borough's 799 registered voters, for a turnout of 40.6%. In the 2009 gubernatorial election, Republican Chris Christie received 282 votes (69.6% vs. 55.8% countywide), ahead of Democrat Jon Corzine with 65 votes (16.0% vs. 34.1%), Independent Chris Daggett with 52 votes (12.8% vs. 8.7%) and other candidates with 5 votes (1.2% vs. 0.7%), among the 405 ballots cast by the borough's 743 registered voters, yielding a 54.5% turnout (vs. 52.5% in the county).

United States Senate election results for Far Hills1
Year	Republican		Democratic		Third party(ies)	
Year	No.	%	No.	%	No.	%
2024	340	58.32%	230	39.45%	13	2.23%
2018	267	60.41%	162	36.65%	13	2.94%
2012	335	71.73%	127	27.19%	5	1.07%
2006	263	71.66%	98	26.70%	6	1.63%

United States Senate election results for Far Hills2
Year	Republican		Democratic		Third party(ies)	
Year	No.	%	No.	%	No.	%
2020	362	57.01%	267	42.05%	6	0.94%
2014	231	74.76%	75	24.27%	3	0.97%
2013	165	73.01%	59	26.11%	2	0.88%
2008	375	70.22%	149	27.90%	10	1.87%

== Education ==
Students in public school attend the schools of the Somerset Hills School District, a regional school district covering pre-kindergarten through twelfth grade serving students from Bernardsville, Far Hills, and Peapack-Gladstone, along with students from Bedminster who attend the district's high school as part of a sending/receiving relationship. As of the 2022–23 school year, the district, comprised of three schools, had an enrollment of 1,761 students and 151.3 classroom teachers (on an FTE basis), for a student–teacher ratio of 11.6:1. Schools in the district (with 2022–23 enrollment data from the National Center for Education Statistics) are Marion T. Bedwell Elementary School with 453 students in grades PreK–4, Bernardsville Middle School with 458 students in grades 5–8 and Bernards High School with 812 students in grades 9–12. The district's board of education is comprised of nine elected members (plus one appointed member representing Bedminster) who set policy and oversee the fiscal and educational operation of the district through its administration. The nine elected seats on the board are allocated to the constituent municipalities based on population, with one seat allocated to Far Hills.

Far Hills Country Day School is a private, nonsectarian coeducational day school located in Far Hills, serving students in nursery through eighth grade since 1929 on a 55-acre (220,000 m^{2}) campus.

== Transportation ==
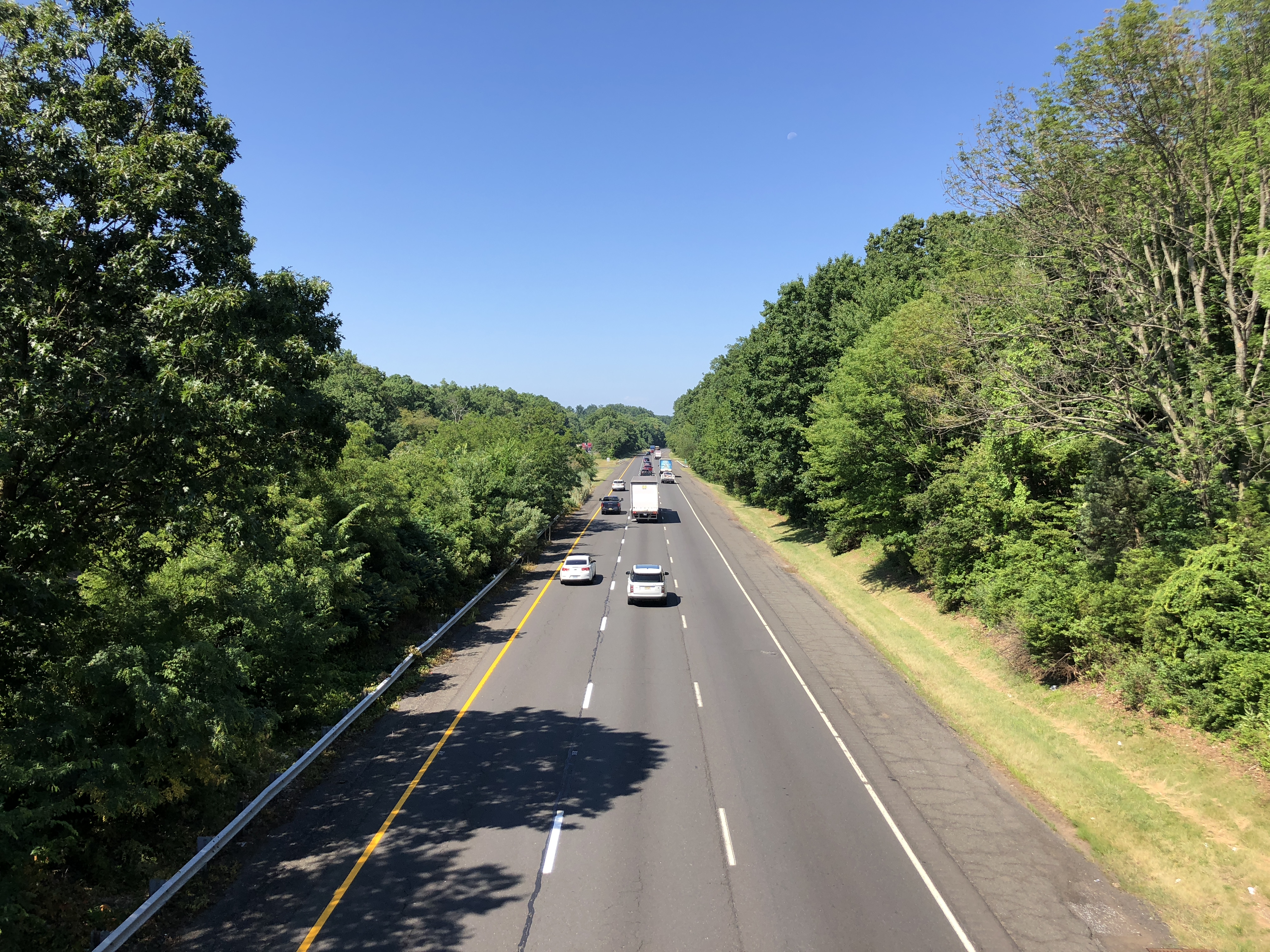
Interstate 287 southbound in Far Hills

=== Roads and highways ===
As of May 2010, the borough had a total of 15.28 miles (24.59 km) of roadways, of which 9.70 miles (15.61 km) were maintained by the municipality, 2.59 miles (4.17 km) by Somerset County and 2.99 miles (4.81 km) by the New Jersey Department of Transportation.

The most prominent highway serving Far Hills is I-287. US 202 also passes through the borough.

=== Public transportation ===
NJ Transit provides train service at the Far Hills Station on the Gladstone Branch of the Morristown Line; the building is listed on the National Register of Historic Places and is located at U.S. Route 202, near the intersection of Far Hills Road, one half mile east of U.S. Route 206, offering service via Secaucus Junction and New York Penn Station or to Hoboken Terminal.

Lakeland Bus Lines provides Route 78 rush-hour service from Bedminster to the Port Authority Bus Terminal in Midtown Manhattan.

== Notable people ==
People who were born in, residents of, or otherwise closely associated with Far Hills include:

- Nicholas F. Brady (born 1930), former United States Secretary of the Treasury who represented New Jersey in the United States Senate
- James Chesson (born 1980), race car driver
- P. J. Chesson (born 1978), IndyCar driver who raced in the 2006 Indianapolis 500
- Alana Cook (born 1997), professional soccer center back for the Kansas City Current
- Charles W. Engelhard Jr. (1917–1971), businessman who controlled an international mining and metals conglomerate and was a major owner of thoroughbred race horses
- Malcolm Forbes (1919–1990), former editor-in-chief of Forbes magazine
- Steve Forbes (born 1947), editor-in-chief of Forbes
- Joseph S. Frelinghuysen Jr. (1912–2005), author of Passages to Freedom, about his escape from a prison camp in Italy during World War II
- J. Geils (1946–2017), blues-rock lead guitarist, singer, and founder of The J. Geils Band
- Jack H. Jacobs (born 1945), retired colonel in the United States Army and a Medal of Honor recipient for his actions during the Vietnam War
- John S. Penn (1926–2013), politician who represented the 16th Legislative District in the New Jersey General Assemblyfrom 1984 to 1994
- Joe J. Plumeri (born 1943), Chairman & CEO of Willis Group and owner of the Trenton Thunder
- Michael F. Price (1951–2022), value investor and fund manager
- Aileen Quinn (born 1971), actress, singer and dancer best known for her role as Annie Bennett Warbucks in the 1982 film Annie
- Andrew Schlafly (born 1961), founder of Conservapedia, son of Phyllis Schlafly
- James Wallwork (1930–2024), politician who served in both houses of the New Jersey Legislature
- Christine Todd Whitman (born 1946), former Governor of New Jersey
- Kate Whitman Annis (born c. 1978), general manager of the Metropolitan Riveters of the National Women's Hockey League
