= National Register of Historic Places listings in Lowndes County, Georgia =

This is a list of properties and districts in Lowndes County, Georgia that are listed on the National Register of Historic Places (NRHP).

This National Park Service list is complete through NPS recent listings posted March 21, 2025.

== Current listings ==
	Name on the Register	Image	Date listed	Location	City or town	Description
1	Barber-Pittman House	Barber-Pittman House	February 12, 1980 (#80001108)	416 N. Ashley St. 30°50′07″N 83°16′47″W	Valdosta	
2	Brookwood North Historic District	Brookwood North Historic District	June 2, 1995 (#95000684)	Roughly bounded by Patterson St., Georgia Ave., Oak St., Park Ave., Williams St. and Brookwood Dr. 30°51′06″N 83°17′16″W	Valdosta	Contributing property at 1521 N Patterson St.
3	Carnegie Library of Valdosta	Carnegie Library of Valdosta	January 12, 1984 (#84001120)	305 W. Central Ave. 30°49′50″N 83°16′58″W	Valdosta	Built in 1914, it now houses the Lowndes County Historical Society and Museum
4	Converse-Dalton House	Converse-Dalton House	April 28, 1983 (#83000233)	305 N. Patterson St. 30°50′00″N 83°16′48″W	Valdosta	
5	The Crescent	The Crescent	January 8, 1980 (#80001109)	904 N. Paterson St. 30°50′22″N 83°17′02″W	Valdosta	
6	Crestwood	Crestwood	January 12, 1984 (#84001147)	502 Eager Rd. 30°52′14″N 83°18′10″W	Valdosta	Built in 1915, it is down a private gated drive, but visible from public property.
7	Dasher High School	Dasher High School	April 18, 1985 (#85000849)	900 S. Troup St. 30°50′49″N 83°16′11″W	Valdosta	
8	East End Historic District	East End Historic District	May 21, 2005 (#05000427)	NE of downtown Valdosta roughly bounded by North Ashley and E. Ann Sts., East Hill Ave., and Georgia and Florida RR; 30°50′19″N 83°16′25″W	Valdosta	Contributing property at 315 E Central Ave.
9	Ewell Brown General Store	Ewell Brown General Store	February 21, 1997 (#97000099)	RR Ave., jct. with Lawrence St. 30°40′59″N 83°10′56″W	Lake Park	Now houses the Lake Park Museum
10	Fairview Historic District	Fairview Historic District	June 28, 1984 (#84001149)	W. Central, Floyd, River, Varnedoe, and Wells Sts. 30°49′50″N 83°17′07″W	Valdosta	
11	First Presbyterian Church	First Presbyterian Church	November 2, 1987 (#87001912)	313 N. Patterson St. 30°50′03″N 83°16′10″W	Valdosta	
12	Hahira Commercial Historic District	Hahira Commercial Historic District	March 18, 2022 (#100006746)	Centered on Main St. (GA 122) between Marshall St. and Church St. (US 41); 30°59′28″N 83°22′27″W	Hahira	District includes Hahira City Hall
13	Lowndes County Courthouse	Lowndes County Courthouse	September 18, 1980 (#80001110)	100 E. Central Ave. 30°49′57″N 83°16′45″W	Valdosta	
14	North Patterson Street Historic District	North Patterson Street Historic District	June 28, 1984 (#84001151)	1003-1111 N. Patterson St. 30°50′30″N 83°17′05″W	Valdosta	
15	Southside Historic District	Southside Historic District	April 27, 2007 (#07000379)	Roughly bounded by CSX tracks, Bunche Dr., Griffin Ave., Old Statenville Rd., Wisenbake Ln, Dasher Ln., and S. Patterson R 30°49′19″N 83°16′12″W	Valdosta	
16	Sunset Hill Cemetery	Sunset Hill Cemetery	September 10, 2004 (#04000957)	1100 N. Oak St. 30°50′31″N 83°17′29″W	Valdosta	
17	Valdosta Commercial Historic District	Valdosta Commercial Historic District	September 15, 1983 (#83000234)	Roughly bounded by Savannah Ave., Lee, Toombs, and Valley Sts. 30°49′53″N 83°16′43″W	Valdosta	
