= Pittman House =

Pittman House may refer to:

in Canada

- Pittman Hall, a residence at Toronto Metropolitan University), in Toronto

in the United States

- Wilson-Pittman-Campbell-Gregory House, Fayetteville, Arkansas, listed on the NRHP in Washington County, Arkansas
- Barber-Pittman House, Valdosta, Georgia, listed on the NRHP in Lowndes County, Georgia
