= Southside Historic District =

Southside Historic District may refer to:

- Southside Historic District (Birmingham, Alabama), listed on the National Register of Historic Places in Jefferson County, Alabama
- Southside Historic District (Valdosta, Georgia), listed on the National Register of Historic Places in Lowndes County, Georgia
- Plymouth Southside Historic District, Plymouth, Indiana, National Register of Historic Places listings in Marshall County, Indiana
- Missoula Southside Historic District, Missoula, Montana, listed on the NRHP in Montana
- Southside Historic District (Corning, New York), listed on the NRHP in Steuben County, New York
- Grand Forks Near Southside Historic District, Grand Forks, North Dakota, listed on the NRHP in North Dakota
- Fairmount-Southside Historic District, Fort Worth, Texas, listed on the NRHP in Tarrant County, Texas
- Southside Historic District (Racine, Wisconsin), listed on the National Register of Historic Places in Racine County, Wisconsin
