= Crestwood =

Crestwood may refer to:

== Places ==
=== Australia ===
- Crestwood, Queanbeyan, New South Wales
- Crestwood, Sydney, New South Wales
- Crestwood Estate, Thornlie, Western Australia

=== Canada ===
- Crestwood (Edmonton), a neighborhood in the City of Edmonton, Alberta

=== United States ===
(by state)

- Crestwood Hills, Los Angeles, California
- Crestwood (Valdosta, Georgia), listed on the NRHP in Georgia
- Crestwood, Illinois
- Crestwood, Kentucky
- Crestwood, Missouri
- Crestwood Historic District, Kansas City, MO, listed on the NRHP in Missouri
- Crestwood Village, New Jersey
- Crestwood (Yonkers), a neighborhood of Yonkers, New York
- Crestwood, Portland, Oregon, a neighborhood of Portland, Oregon
- Crestwood/Glen Cove, Houston, a neighborhood of Houston, Texas
- Crestwood (Washington, D.C.), a neighborhood of Washington, D.C.

== Other uses ==
- Crestwood Community School, in Eastleigh, Hampshire, England
- Crestwood Preparatory College, a high school in Toronto, Ontario, Canada
- Crestwood Publications, a comic book publisher from the 1940s through the 1960s
- Epiphone Crestwood, a guitar manufactured from 1958 to 1970 by Epiphone
