= William Stanley West =

American politician

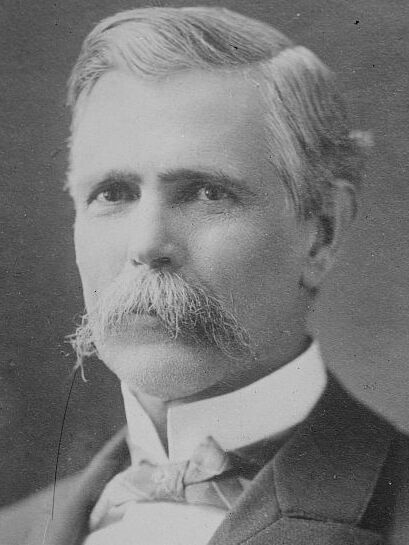

United States Senator from Georgia
- In office March 2, 1914 – November 3, 1914
- Appointed by: John M. Slaton
- Preceded by: Augustus O. Bacon
- Succeeded by: Thomas W. Hardwick

Member of the Georgia Senate
- In office 1901-1906

Member of the Georgia House of Representatives
- In office 1892-1901

Personal details
- Born: August 23, 1849 Buena Vista, Georgia, U.S.
- Died: December 22, 1914 (aged 65) Valdosta, Georgia, U.S.
- Party: Democratic

William Stanley West (August 23, 1849 – December 22, 1914) was a United States senator from the state of Georgia. He was a Democrat. He is notable for being the first person appointed to the Senate after ratification of the Seventeenth Amendment made that possible.

== Biography ==
West was born in Buena Vista, Georgia, on August 23, 1849. He studied law at Mercer University and graduated in 1876. After passing the bar that same year, West became a practicing attorney. West served in the Georgia House of Representatives from 1892 until 1901 and the Georgia Senate from 1901 until 1906. He was appointed to the U.S. Senate in 1914 to serve the remainder of the term of Augustus O. Bacon who had died earlier that year. West served until Thomas W. Hardwick was elected to fill Bacon's seat.

Only one month after leaving his senatorial position, West died on December 22, 1914, in Valdosta, Georgia. He was buried in Sunset Hill Cemetery in that same city.

== Establishing Valdosta State University ==
West was instrumental as a State Senator in establishing the South Georgia State Normal College (now Valdosta State University). In 1906, West and State Representative C.R. Ashley presented bills proposing the establishment of a college in Valdosta to the Georgia Senate and the House of Representatives, respectively. By an act of the Georgia State Legislature that year the establishment of an agricultural, industrial, or normal college in South Georgia was approved. Despite the legislation, no funding was granted until the summer of 1911. West donated fifty acres of land for the campus.

West Hall, built in 1917, is named in his honor.

== The Crescent ==
West's former house in Valdosta, known as the Crescent, is listed in the National Register of Historic Places. Built in 1898 the old home and grounds now serve as the Valdosta Garden Center, a home for several garden clubs around the city, and is one of the most recognized symbols of the city.

U.S. Senate
Preceded by Augustus O. Bacon	U.S. Senator (Class 2) from Georgia; March 2, 1914 – November 3, 1914; Served alongside: M. Hoke Smith	Succeeded by Thomas W. Hardwick
