= Converse–Dalton House =

Historic house in Georgia, United States

- U.S. National Register of Historic Places
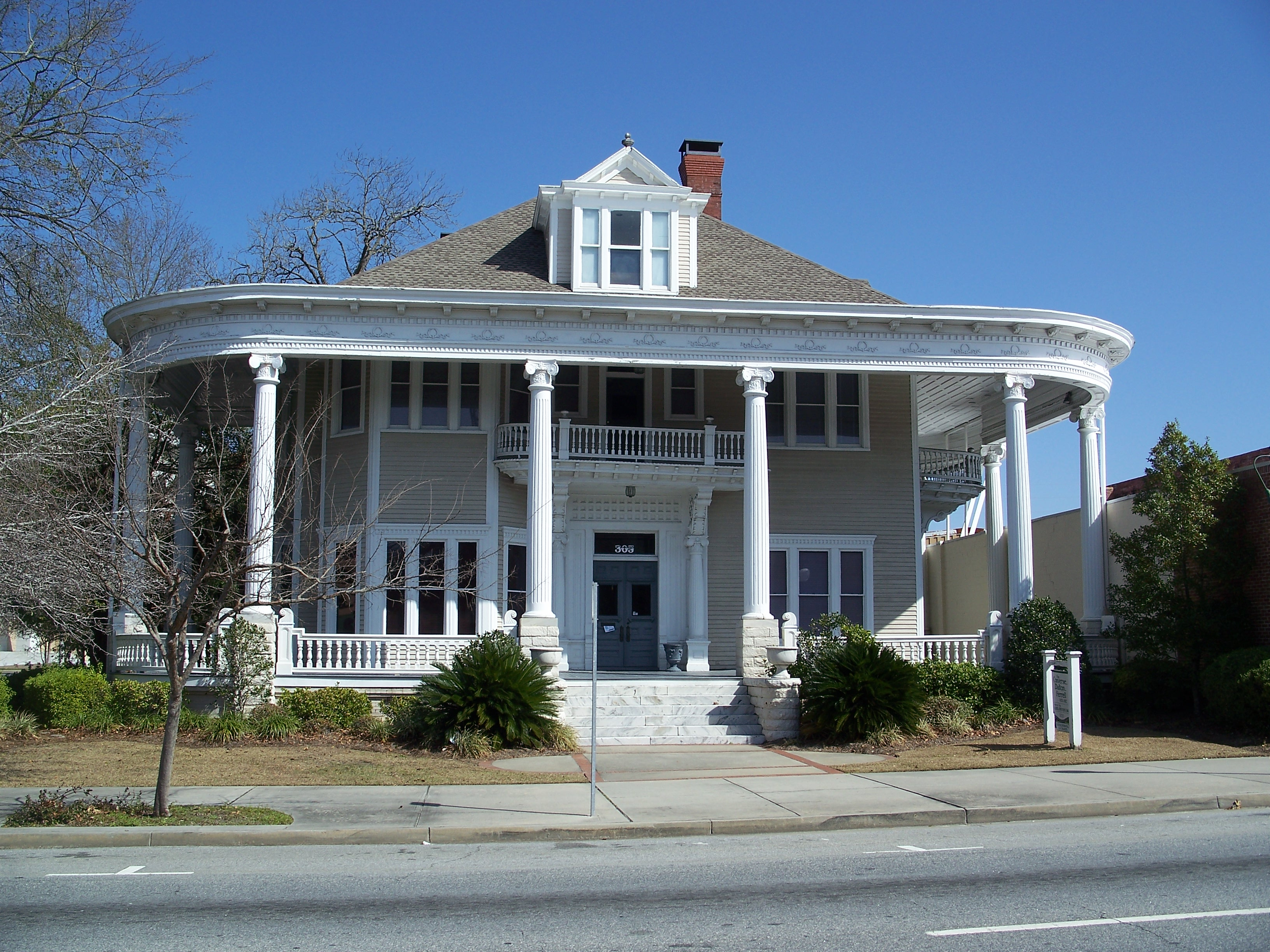

- Location within Georgia Location within the United States
- Location: 305 N. Patterson St., Valdosta, Georgia
- Coordinates: 30.8333°N 83.27988°W
- Area: less than one acre
- Built: 1902
- Built by: Stephen F. Fulgham
- Architect: Alexander F. N. Everett
- Architectural style: Classical Revival
- NRHP reference No.: 83000233
- Added to NRHP: April 28, 1983

The Converse–Dalton House, also known as the Converse Dalton Ferrell House, is a historic residence in Valdosta, Georgia, in the United States. It was built in 1902 for Thomas Briggs Converse Sr., his wife, and their thirteen children. It was added to the National Register of Historic Places on April 28, 1983. It is located at 305 North Patterson Street. The house is now used as a home for the Valdosta Junior Service League.

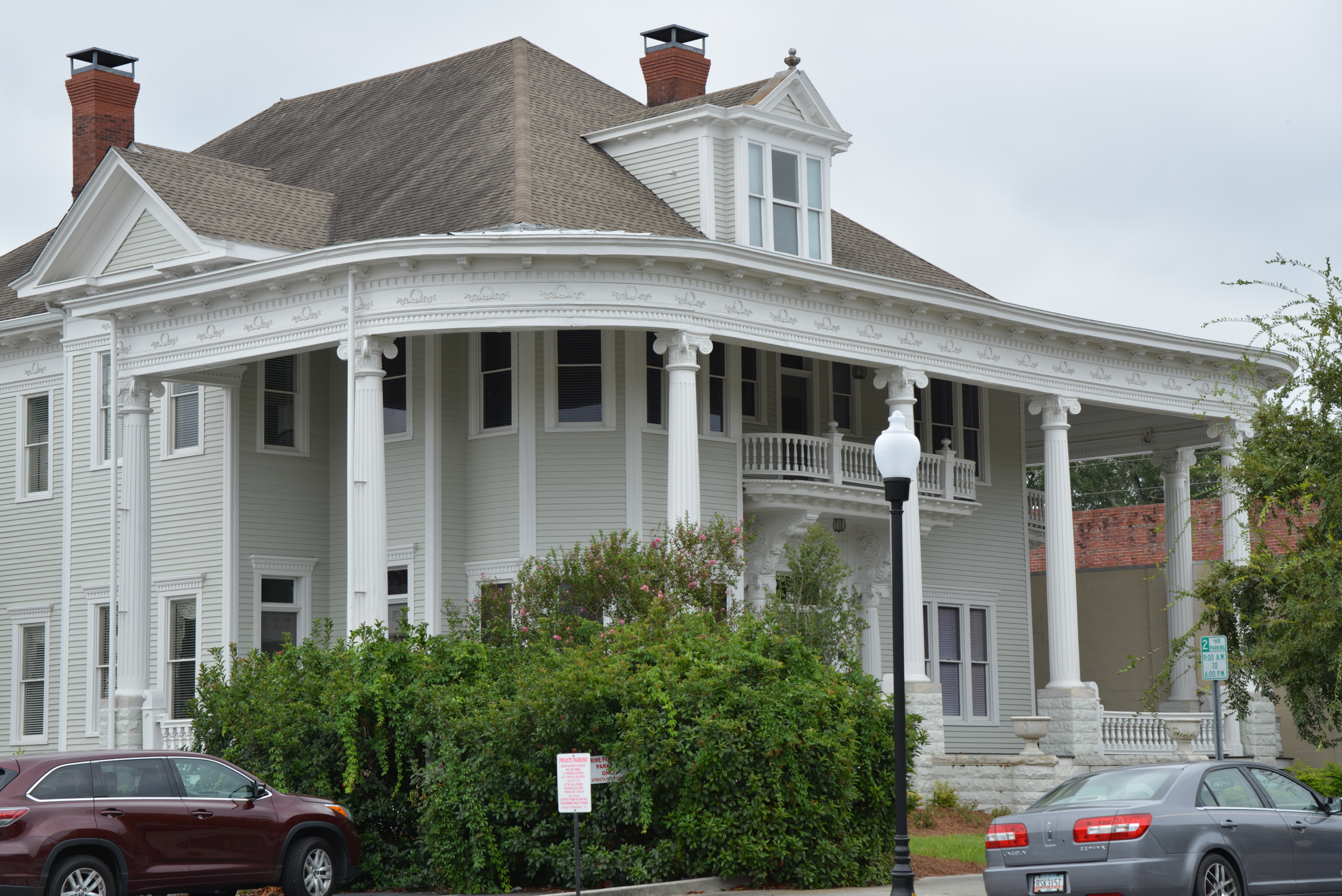
Converse–Dalton House

It is a three-story house with a monumental two-story portico that wraps around with curving corners.

The house was designed by architect Alexander F. N. Everett. The house was built by Stephen F. Fulgham (1857-1928), who also designed and/or built the Converse-Girardin Building, at 121-123 North Patterson, and other buildings in the Valdosta Commercial Historic District.

It was deemed significant for its architecture and for its association with its owner, Thomas Briggs Converse Sr. (1854-1932).

== See also ==
- National Register of Historic Places listings in Lowndes County, Georgia
