= Sunset Hill Cemetery =

Cemetery in Valdosta, Lowndes County, Georgia

- U.S. National Register of Historic Places
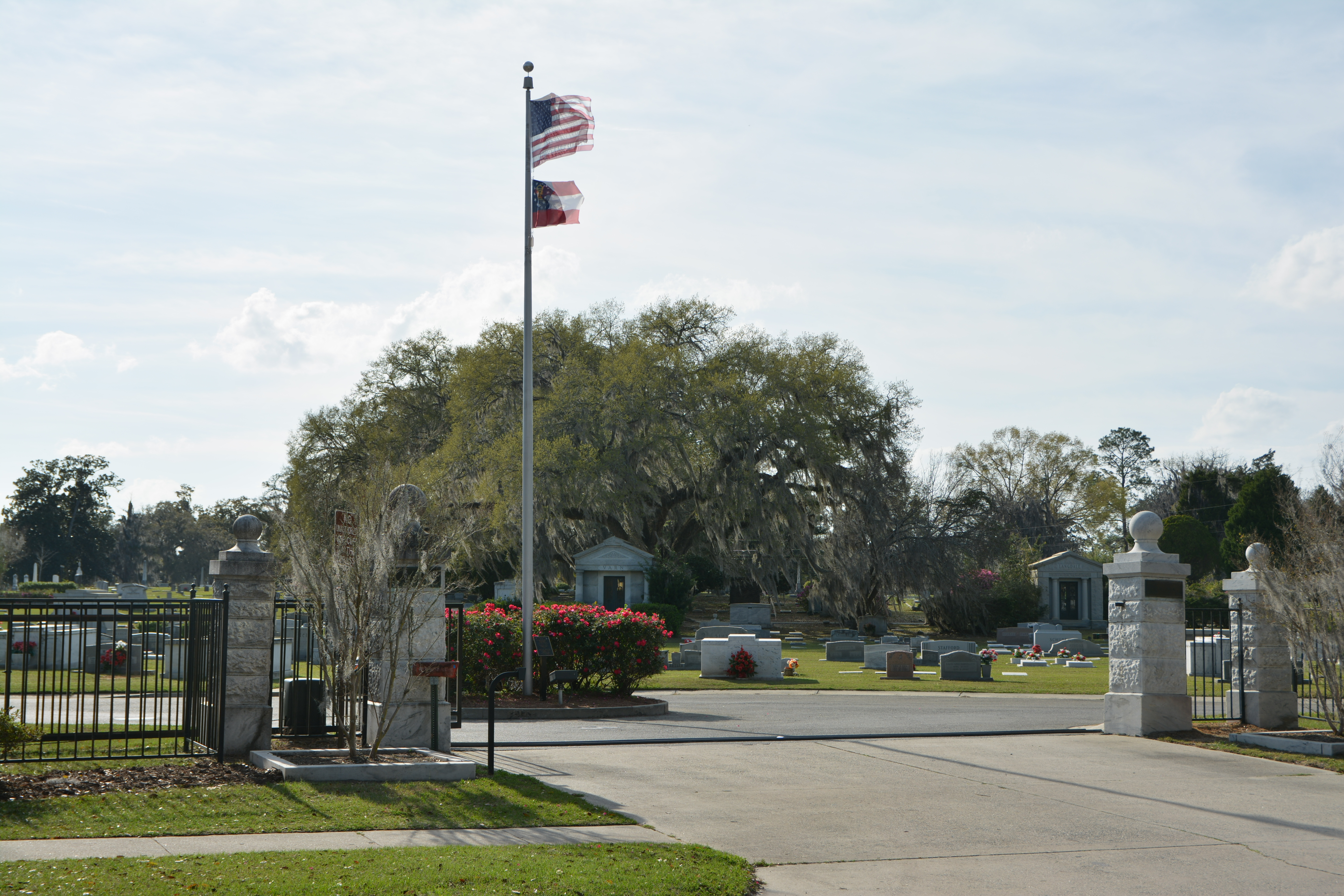
- Front entrance of Sunset Hill Cemetery
- Location: 110 N Oak St, Valdosta, Georgia
- Coordinates: 30°50′32″N 83°17′30″W
- Area: 66 acres (27 ha)
- Built: 1861
- Architectural style: Renaissance, Classical Revival
- NRHP reference No.: 04000957
- Added to NRHP: September 10, 2004

Sunset Hill Cemetery, located northwest of the intersection of North Oak Street and West Mary Street, is the oldest cemetery in Valdosta, Georgia.

== Notable burials ==
These are some of the notable people interred in the cemetery:

- Ellis Clary (1916–2000). MLB player
- Jack Rudolph (1938–2019). Professional football player
- Colonel William S. West (1849–1914). Builder of The Crescent (also listed as a National Historic Landmark in Lowndes County) and US Senator.

== History ==
The cemetery was established in 1861 when former local postmaster Charles Ogden Force donated 30 acres (12 ha) to the city for this purpose. It was added to the National Register of Historic Places on September 10, 2004.

== See also ==
- National Register of Historic Places listings in Lowndes County, Georgia
