= Lanier County Auditorium and Grammar School =

- U.S. National Register of Historic Places
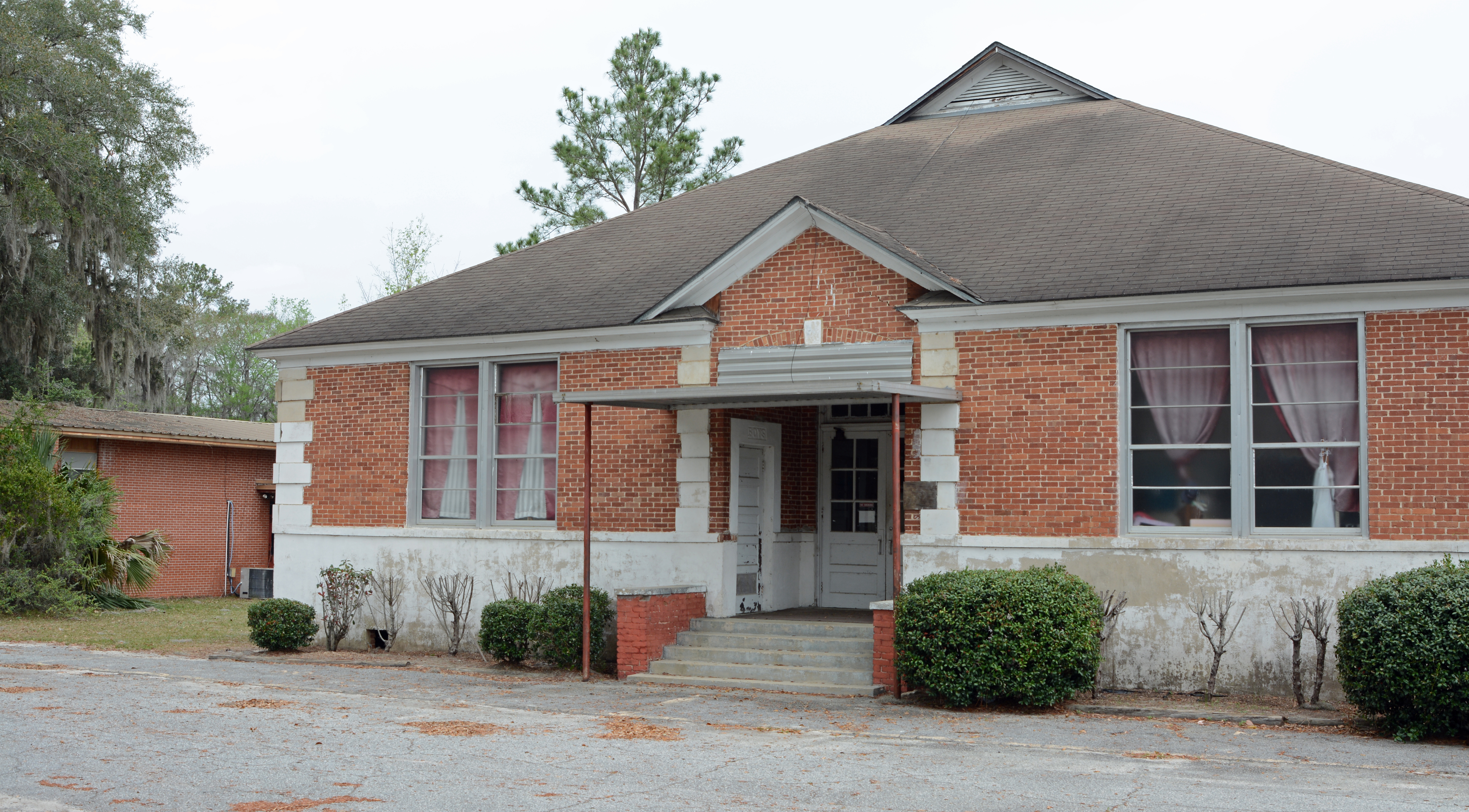

- Location within Georgia
- Location: E. Church Ave., Lakeland, Georgia
- Coordinates: 31°02′35″N 83°04′20″W
- Area: less than one acre
- Built: 1925
- Architect: Greer, Lloyd
- NRHP reference No.: 86000743
- Added to NRHP: April 10, 1986

Lanier County Auditorium and Grammar School are two historic buildings in Lakeland, Lanier County, Georgia, on East Church Avenue. They were built in 1925 under architect Lloyd Greer (1885–1952). Both buildings are one story tall and made of brick and concrete. The school building has a central hall with five classrooms on one side and three on the other. The auditorium seats 600 and the front of the building has two additional classrooms. Some modernization of the plumbing, heating, and electrical systems took place after 1940. They are the only remaining buildings from the consolidation of schools which took place after the county was formed in 1920. The buildings were added to the National Register of Historic Places on April 10, 1986.

== See also ==
- National Register of Historic Places listings in Lanier County, Georgia
