= Valdosta Commercial Historic District =

Historic district in Georgia, United States

- U.S. National Register of Historic Places
- U.S. Historic district
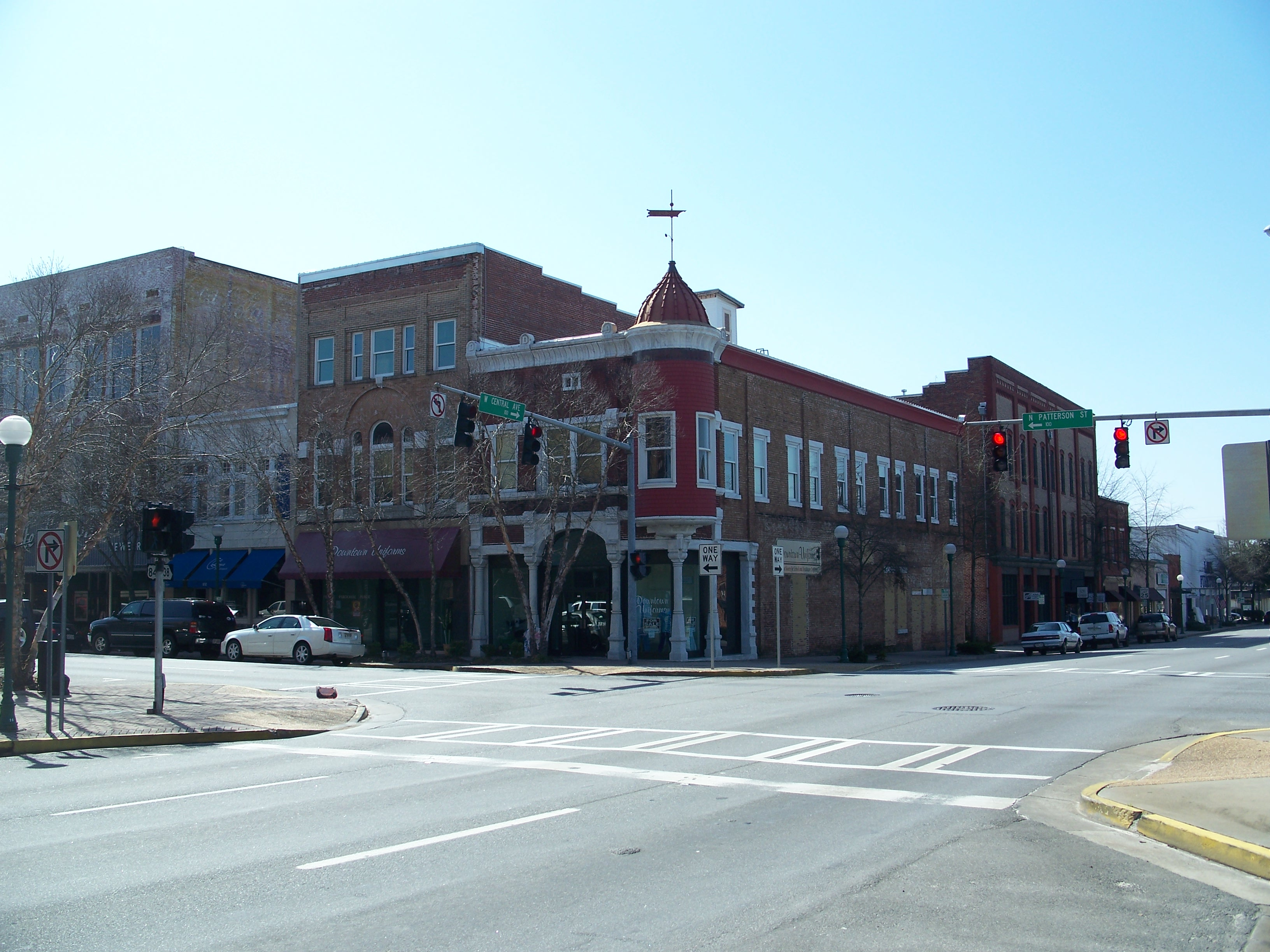

- Location within Georgia Location within the United States
- Location: Roughly bounded by Savannah Ave., Lee, Toombs, and Valley Sts. (original); Roughly bounded by Valley, Lee, and Toombs Sts. and Crane Ave. (increase), Valdosta, Georgia
- Coordinates: 30.831389°N 83.278611°W
- Area: 25 acres (10 ha) (original> 2 acres (0.81 ha) (increase>
- Architect: Multiple
- Architectural style: Late 19th and 20th Century Revivals, Late Victorian, Romanesque, Early Commercial, et al.
- NRHP reference No.: 83000234, 02001633
- Added to NRHP: September 15, 1983 (original); December 31, 2002 (increase)

The Valdosta Commercial Historic District in Valdosta, Georgia is a historic district that was listed on the National Register of Historic Places in 1983 and expanded in 2002. It includes 81 contributing resources and 23 non-contributing resources. The original listing included all or part of nine city blocks in a roughly square 25 acres (10 ha) area. The expansion listing added 2 acres (0.81 ha) with six contributing buildings and its documentation revised the classification of some of the original area's properties.

It includes:

- Lowndes County Courthouse (1906), designed by Frank P. Milburn (1868-1926), separately listed on the NRHP in 1980
- 111 South Ashley Street, designed by Stephen F. Fulgham (1857-1928)
- Converse-Girardin Building, 121-123 North Patterson, designed by Stephen F. Fulgham
- First Baptist Church (1898), designed by Stephen F. Fulgham
- U.S. Courthouse and Post Office (1908), the current Valdosta City Hall, designed by Lloyd Greer (1885-

1952)

- Daniel Ashley Hotel, designed by Edward E. Dougherty (1876-1943) of Dougherty and Gardner.
- First Methodist Church (1905).
