= North Patterson Street Historic District =

Historic district in Georgia, United States

- U.S. National Register of Historic Places
- U.S. Historic district
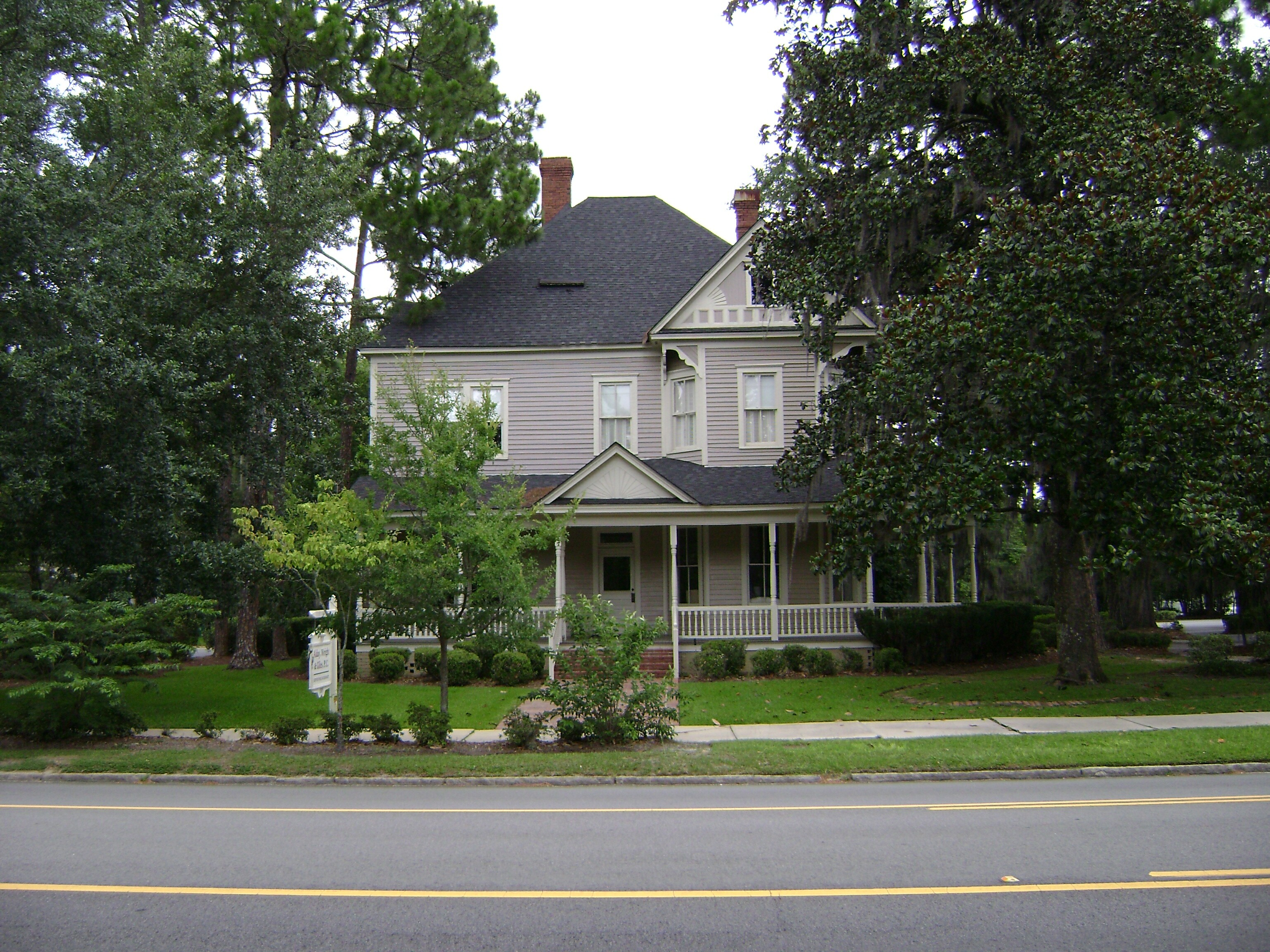

- Location within Georgia Location within the United States
- Location: 1003-1111 N. Patterson St., Valdosta, Georgia
- Coordinates: 30°50′30″N 83°17′5″W
- Area: 8.3 acres (3.4 ha)
- Built: 1899-1919
- Built by: Multiple
- Architectural style: Classical Revival, Stick/eastlake, Victorian Eclectic
- NRHP reference No.: 84001151
- Added to NRHP: June 28, 1984

The North Patterson Street Historic District is a historic district of 14 "grand homes" on North Patterson Street in Valdosta, Georgia. It was listed on the National Register of Historic Places in 1984.

The district is 8.3 acres (3.4 ha) in size and has 14 contributing buildings, all one-story or two-story residences, along 1003 to 1111 N. Patterson Street. All but one of the homes were probably built during 1899 to 1909. The known exception is 1106 North Patterson which was designed by architect Lloyd Greer in 1919 to replace the 1902 J.C. Fender house which was moved and turned to face Mary Street instead (and is still included in the district). The expansion of downtown commercial area has destroyed grand homes which previously were located to the south of this section of Patterson Street.

It includes Classical Revival, Stick/Eastlake, and Victorian Eclectic architecture. Classical Revival is represented by 1007 North Patterson Street, which has a monumental portico with Corinthian columns.
