= Fairview Historic District =

Historic district in Georgia, United States

- U.S. National Register of Historic Places
- U.S. Historic district
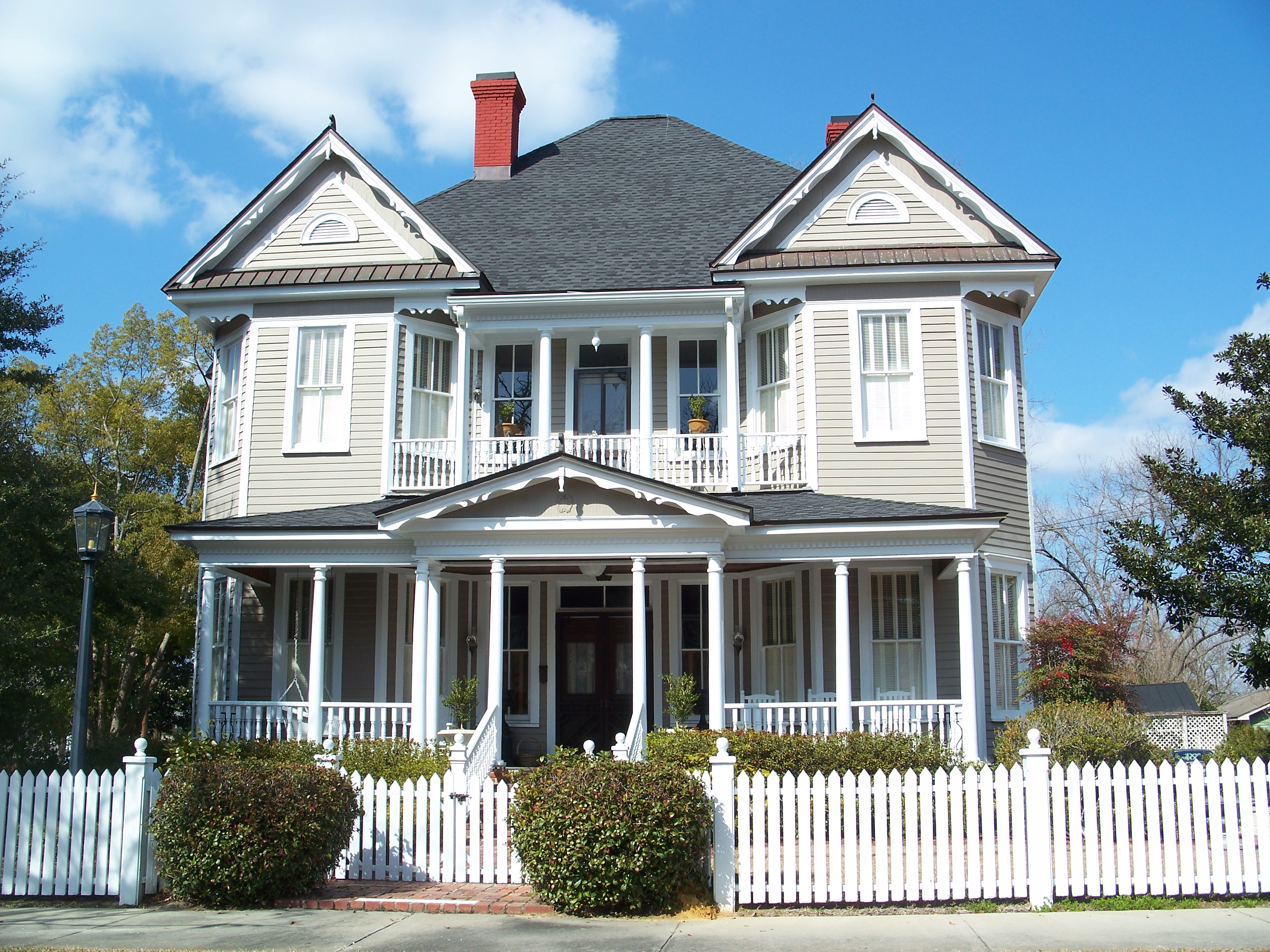

- Location within Georgia Location within the United States
- Location: W. Central, Floyd, River, Varnedoe, and Wells Sts., Valdosta, Georgia
- Coordinates: 30°49′50″N 83°17′7″W
- Area: 9.5 acres (3.8 ha)
- Architect: Multiple
- Architectural style: Late 19th And 20th Century Revivals, Late Victorian, Prairie
- NRHP reference No.: 84001149
- Added to NRHP: June 28, 1984

Fairview Historic District, in Valdosta in Lowndes County, Georgia, is a 9.5 acres (3.8 ha) historic district which was listed on the National Register of Historic Places in 1984. It included 21 contributing buildings.

It includes works designed by architect Lloyd Greer and by Valdosta architect and contractor Stephen F. Fulghum (1857-1928).
