= West Hall (Valdosta State University) =

Coordinates: 30.84939°N 83.28904°W

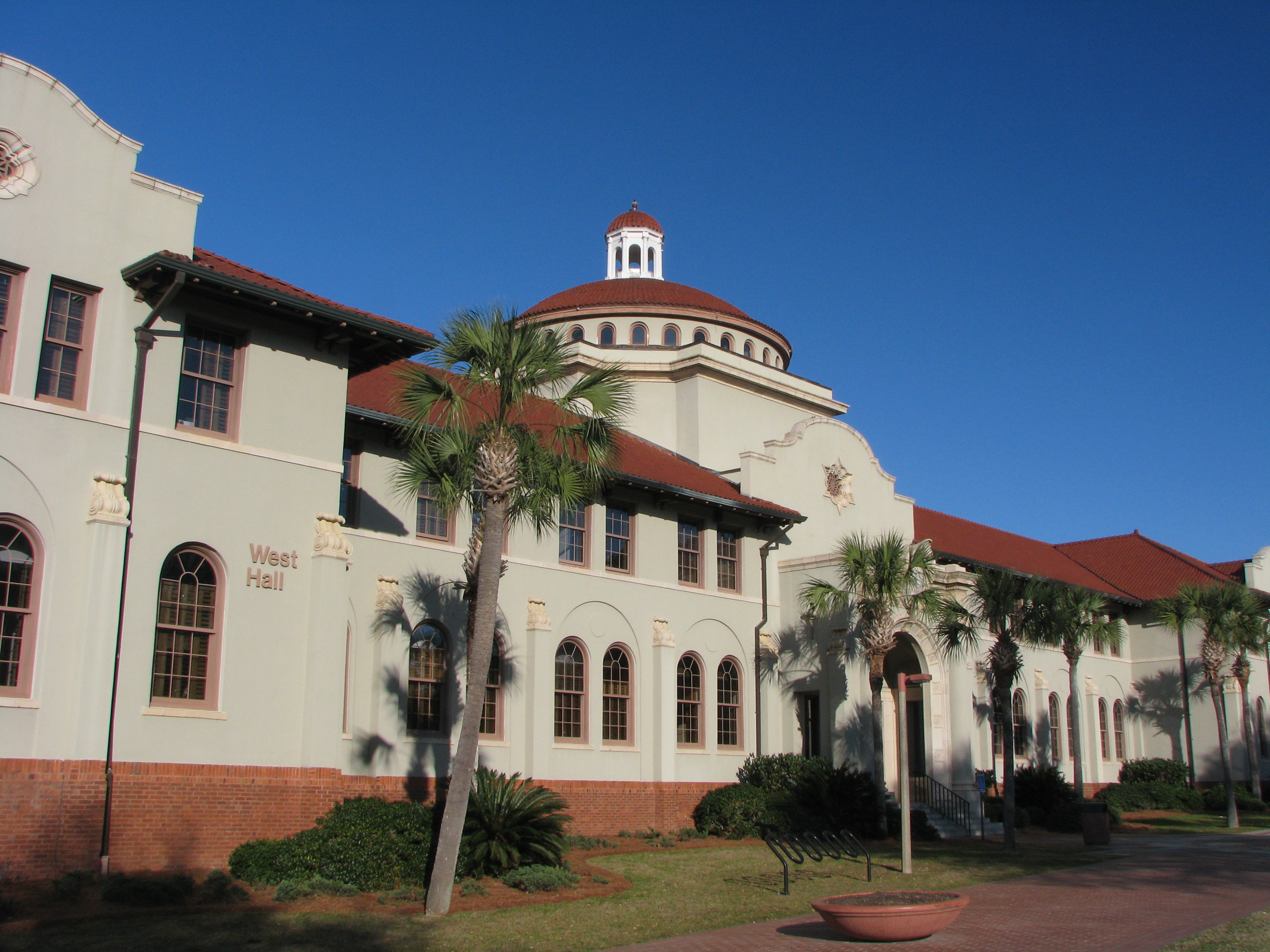
- Interactive map of the West Hall area
- Former names: Administrative Building

General information
- Architectural style: Spanish-mission
- Location: 1500 North Patterson Street, Valdosta, Georgia, USA
- Cost: $75,000
- Owner: Valdosta State University

Technical details
- Floor count: 3
- Floor area: 84,551 square feet

Design and construction
- Architecture firm: Edwards and Sayward

West Hall, built in 1917, is the oldest building at Valdosta State University and features a distinctive dome and Spanish-mission architecture. It is also the center of academic activity at VSU, with numerous classrooms, departments, and offices. West Hall is named in honor of Senator W.S. West, who as a US Senator from Georgia, led the legislation for the creation of a college in Valdosta through the Georgia Senate and donated the property that is now the main part of campus to the state for use by the new institution.

== History ==
=== Construction ===
In 1916 the Georgia legislature made an appropriation of $50,000 to build an Administration building for the South Georgia State Normal College and the city of Valdosta donated an additional $25,000 for the construction. The structure was only the second building constructed at the college. After the building was completed in 1917 it was named West Hall in honor of Senator W.S. West following his death in 1914. West had been one of the driving forces behind the development of a college in Valdosta as the author of the Colleges charter and the first President of the Board of Trustees.

=== Addition ===
A three-story annex was added to the rear of West Hall in the 1960s. The expansion added a greater number of classrooms to better accommodate the growing student population that followed Valdosta State becoming a co-educational institution in 1950. The addition was built in a contemporary style with jalousie windows and cinder blocks and the appearance of the new construction was a departure from the Spanish-mission theme of the original West Hall and the older buildings on campus.

=== Renovation ===
In December 1986 renovations began on West Hall to restore the building to the original design produced in 1910. The interior of West was completely gutted and rebuilt and the exterior was restored to its original Spanish mission architecture. The three-story annex added in to the rear of the building in the 1960s was remodelled to better match the rest of the building, and a two-story addition was built onto the annex as was planned in the original designs. The three-story rotunda was restored with the removal of second- and third-floor areas directly under West Halls distinctive dome. The 70-foot (21 m) rotunda features a bronze medallion containing the seal of the university, which features the exterior of the dome itself, and is implanted in a green marble floor. The restoration of West Hall took two years to complete.

== Current uses ==
West Hall now houses the Administrative Offices of the President, Vice President for Academic Affairs, and the Dean of Arts and Sciences. The Departments of English, Political Science, and Modern and Classical Languages are located in West Hall. In addition, this building houses the Master's of Public Administration Program, the Foreign Language/International Culture Center, the language laboratory, an electronic classroom, the General Studies Program Office, and the Campus Writing Center.

== Photo gallery ==
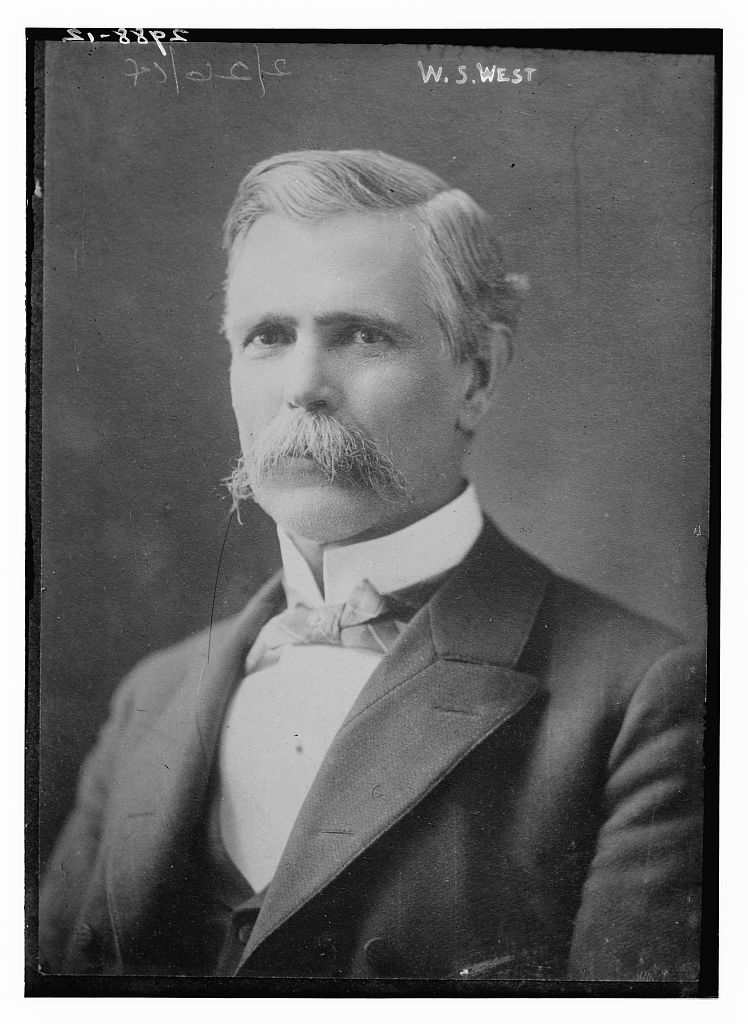
Senator William S. West was instrumental in establishing VSU. West Hall is named in his honor.

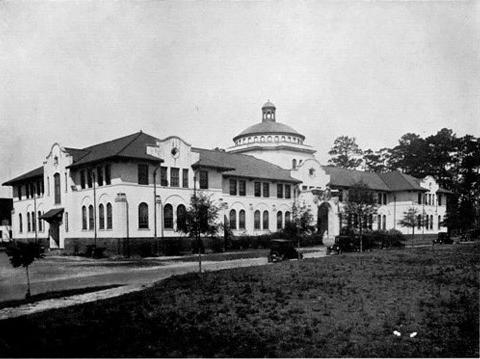
West Hall as it appeared shortly after construction in 1917

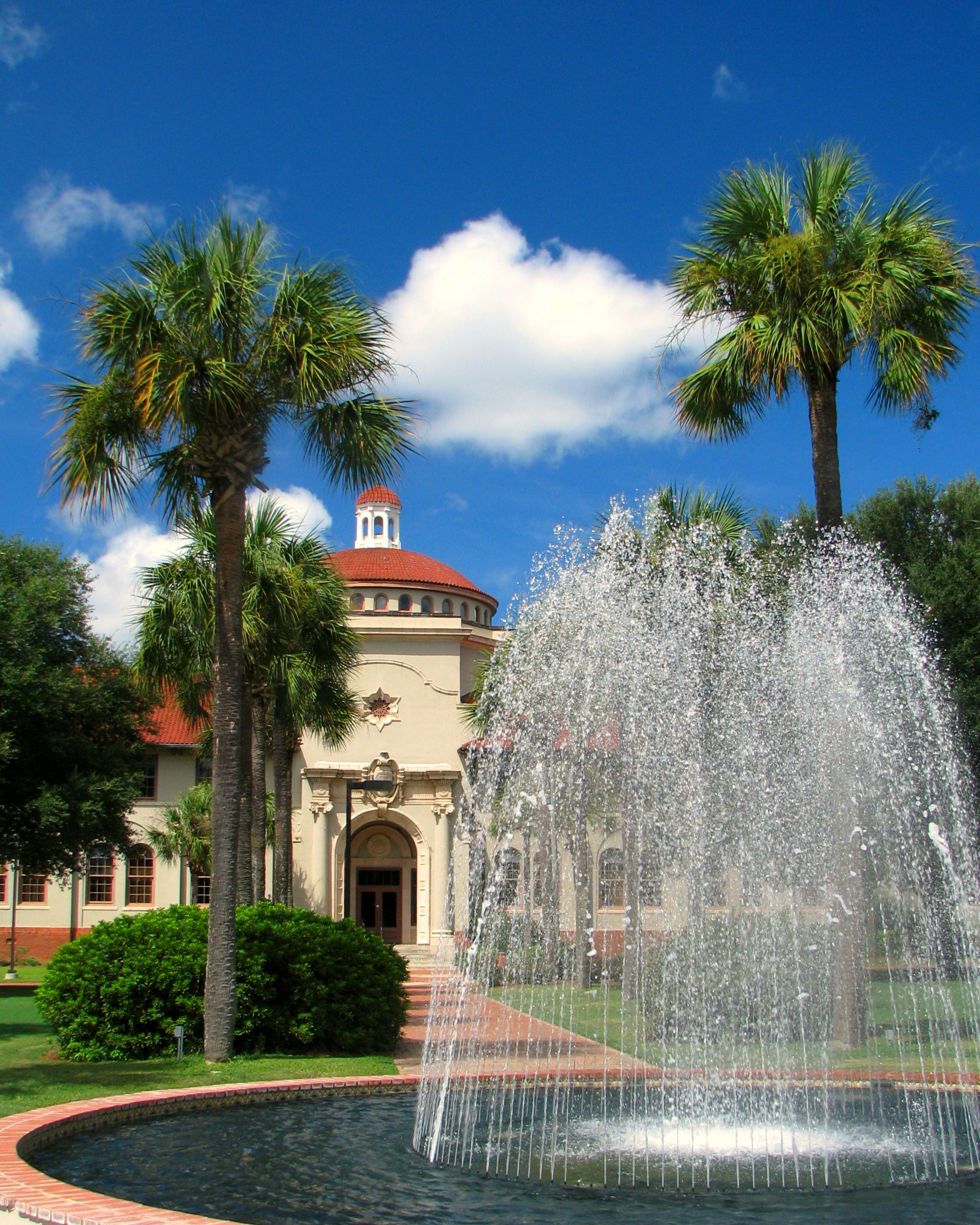
West Hall in 2009 behind the fountain built in 1993 to commemorate Valdosta State achieving University status

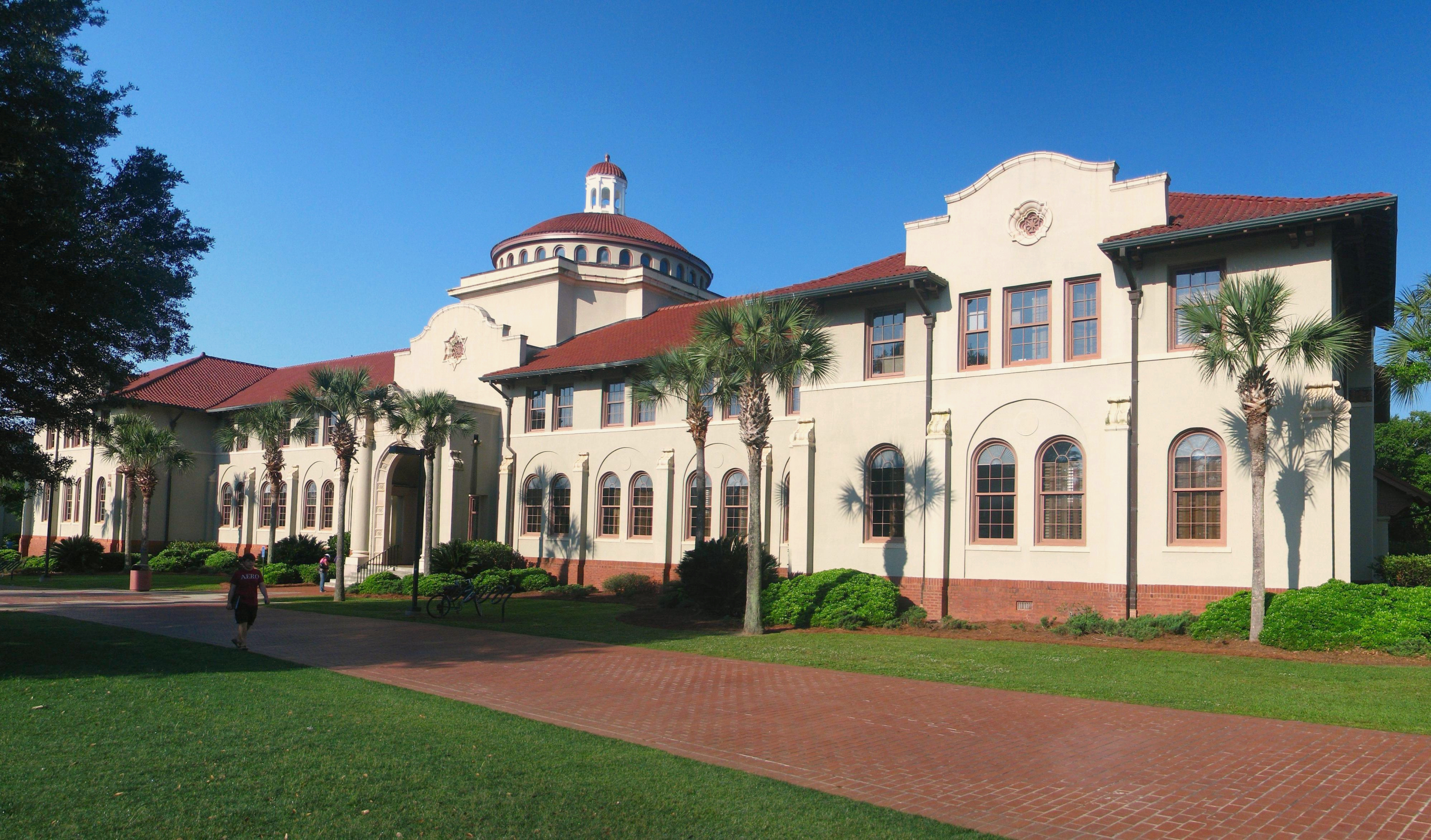
Front face of West Hall in 2010

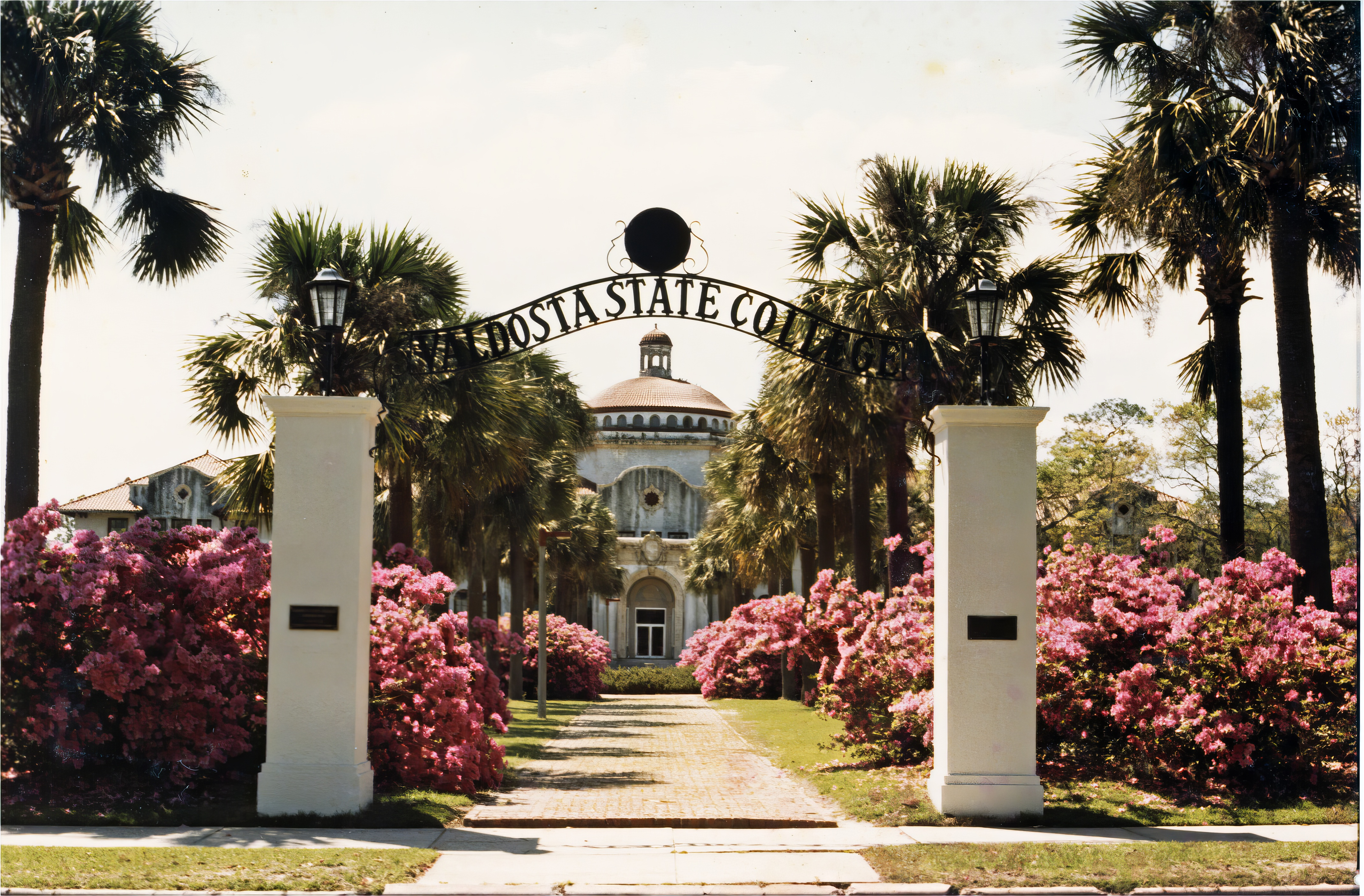
West Hall with the azaleas in bloom, 1986, when it was Valdosta State College
