= Statenville Consolidated School =

Historic school in the U.S.

- U.S. National Register of Historic Places
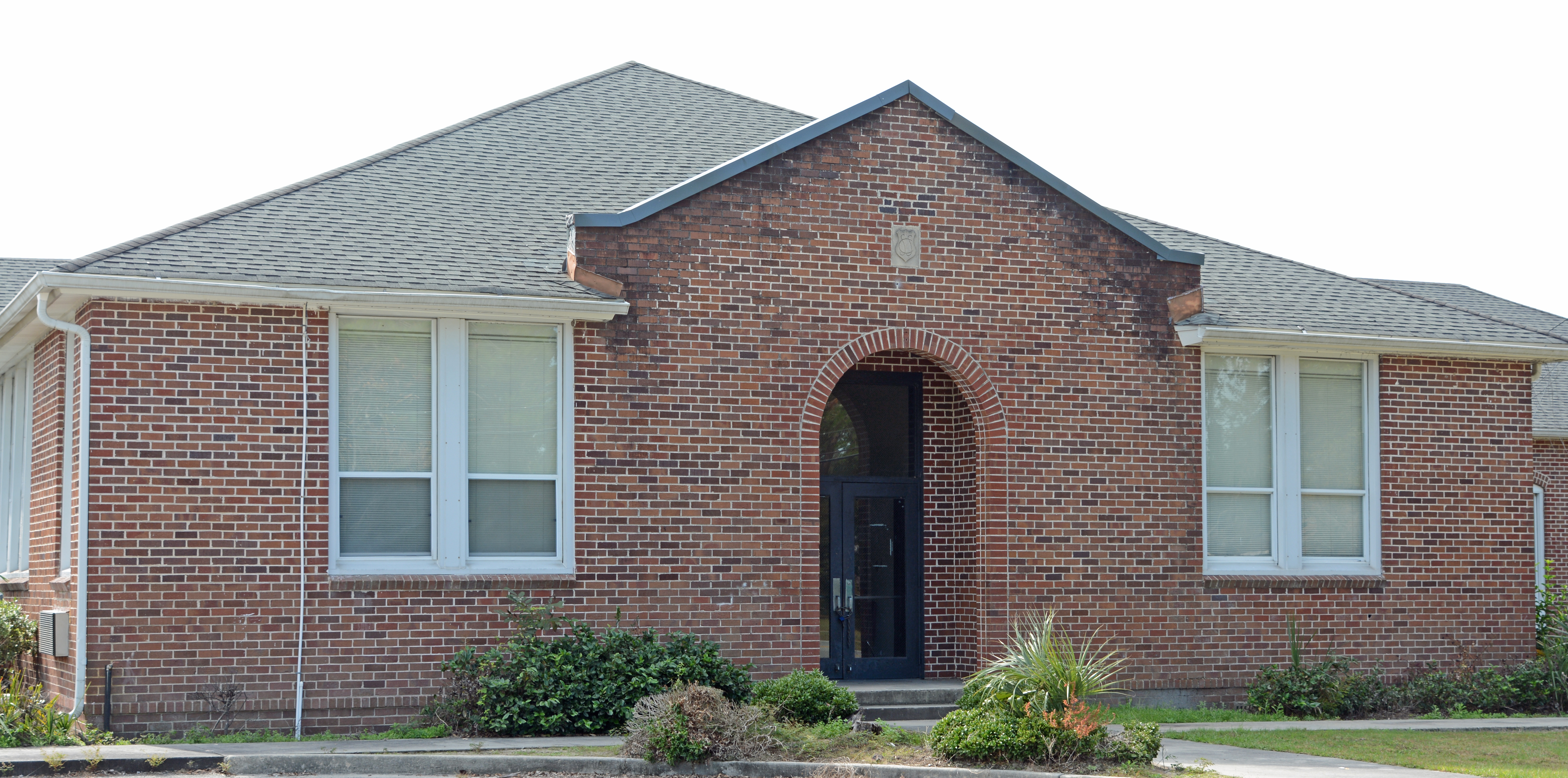

- Location within Georgia Location within the United States
- Location: GA 94, Statenville, Georgia
- Coordinates: 30°42′10″N 83°1′29″W
- Area: 4.4 acres (1.8 ha)
- Built: 1931, 1938-39
- Architect: Lloyd Greer
- Architectural style: Late 19th and 20th century Revivals, Late Gothic Revival, Collegiate Gothic
- NRHP reference No.: 88000606
- Added to NRHP: June 1, 1988

The Statenville Consolidated School, also known as Echols County High School, is located on Georgia Highway 94 in Statenville, Georgia, United States. It was built in 1931 and expanded in 1938–39, it was listed on the National Register of Historic Places in 1988.

This one-story brick building, designed in a simple style, was created by the noted Valdosta architect Lloyd Greer (1885-1952). The school was funded by a county bond issue, which included provisions for an auditorium. From its completion in 1931 until its listing on the National Register of Historic Places (NRHP), the auditorium has served as the largest meeting space in Echols County, and thus has been a social and entertainment hub for the community.
