= Ewell Brown General Store =

Historic store in the US state of Georgia

- U.S. National Register of Historic Places
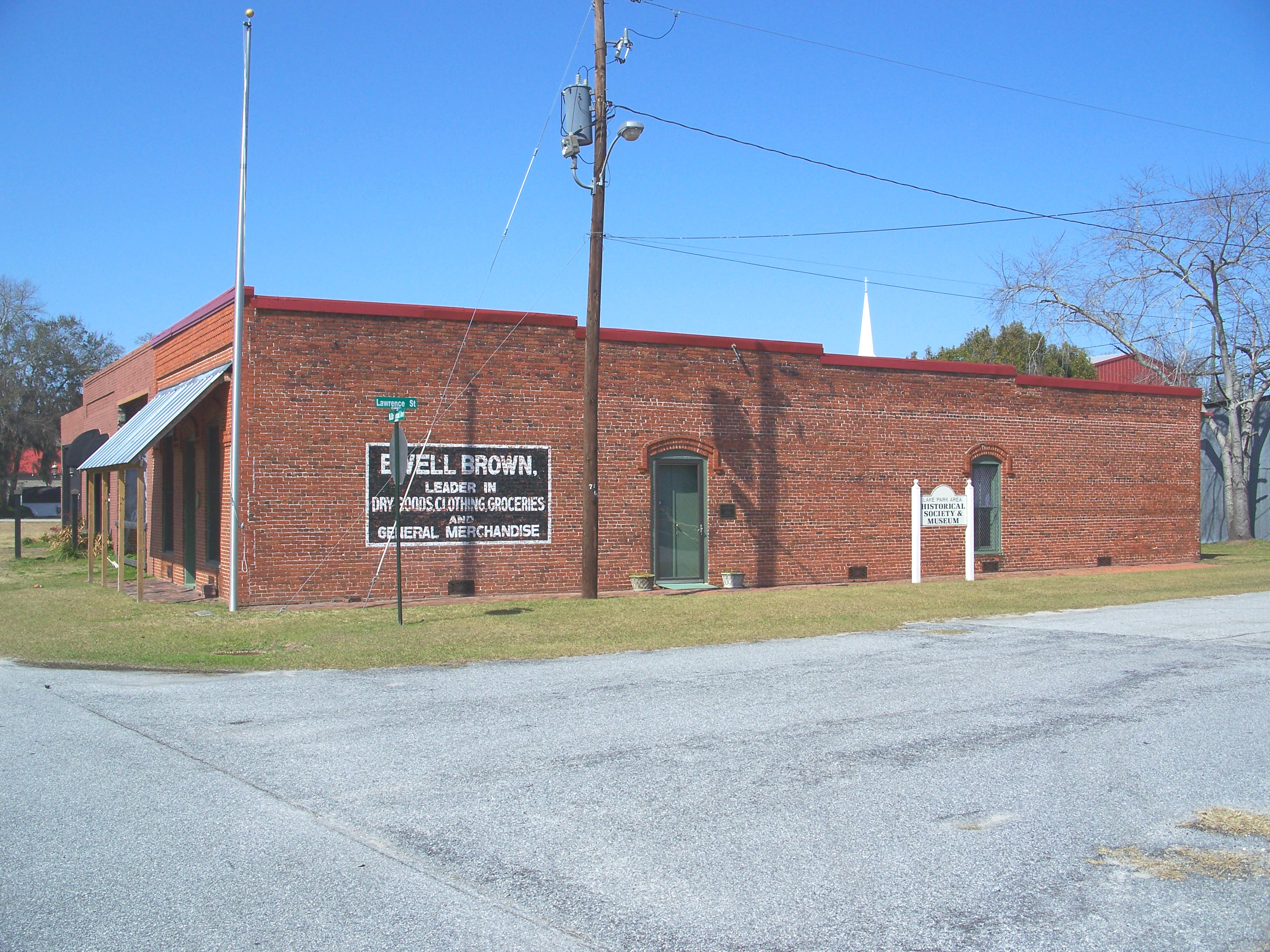

- Location within Georgia
- Location: Railroad Ave., jct. with Lawrence St., Lake Park, Georgia
- Coordinates: 30.683205°N 83.182234°W
- Area: less than one acre
- Built: c. 1890
- Architectural style: folk Victorian
- NRHP reference No.: 97000099
- Added to NRHP: February 21, 1997

The Ewell Brown General Store is a commercial property in Lake Park, Georgia, located at the junction of Railroad Ave. with Lawrence Street, across the street from the railroad. It is a one-story Folk Victorian commercial building built out of brick about 1890. A brick sidewalk with a herringbone pattern was built in the early 1900s. The inside is one large room with a raised office space. The store was originally a drug store and general merchandise store. Ewell Brown bought the store in 1899 and along with his brother, Bob, operated it was a general merchandise store. Bob took over the store in 1948 and it closed in 1953 or 1954, due to the realignment of US 41, which caused a decline in trade. Then it was used for storage except that it was rented for an antique store from 1974-1976. In 1994 the daughter of Bob Brown donated it to the Lake Park Historical Society to use as a museum. It was added to the National Register of Historic Places on February 21, 1997. The building now houses the Lake Park Museum, which includes collections of family histories and artifacts.

According to its NRHP nomination, the store in 1892 was a drug store and general merchandise store that was operated by a Dr. E. Taylor, and Ewell Brown was an employee: a pill roller and assistant operator. The name of the store was changed when Brown purchased it in 1899 to "Ewell Brown, Lender in Dry Goods, Clothing, Groceries and General Merchandise".

== See also ==
- National Register of Historic Places listings in Lowndes County, Georgia
