= National Register of Historic Places listings in Lanier County, Georgia =

This is a list of properties and districts in Lanier County, Georgia that are listed on the National Register of Historic Places (NRHP).

This National Park Service list is complete through NPS recent listings posted March 21, 2025.

== Current listing ==
	Name on the Register	Image	Date listed	Location	City or town	Description
1	Lanier County Auditorium and Grammar School	Lanier County Auditorium and Grammar School	April 10, 1986 (#86000743)	E. Church Ave. 31°02′34″N 83°04′20″W	Lakeland	Built in 1925
