= East End Historic District (Valdosta, Georgia) =

Historic district in Georgia, United States

- U.S. National Register of Historic Places
- U.S. Historic district
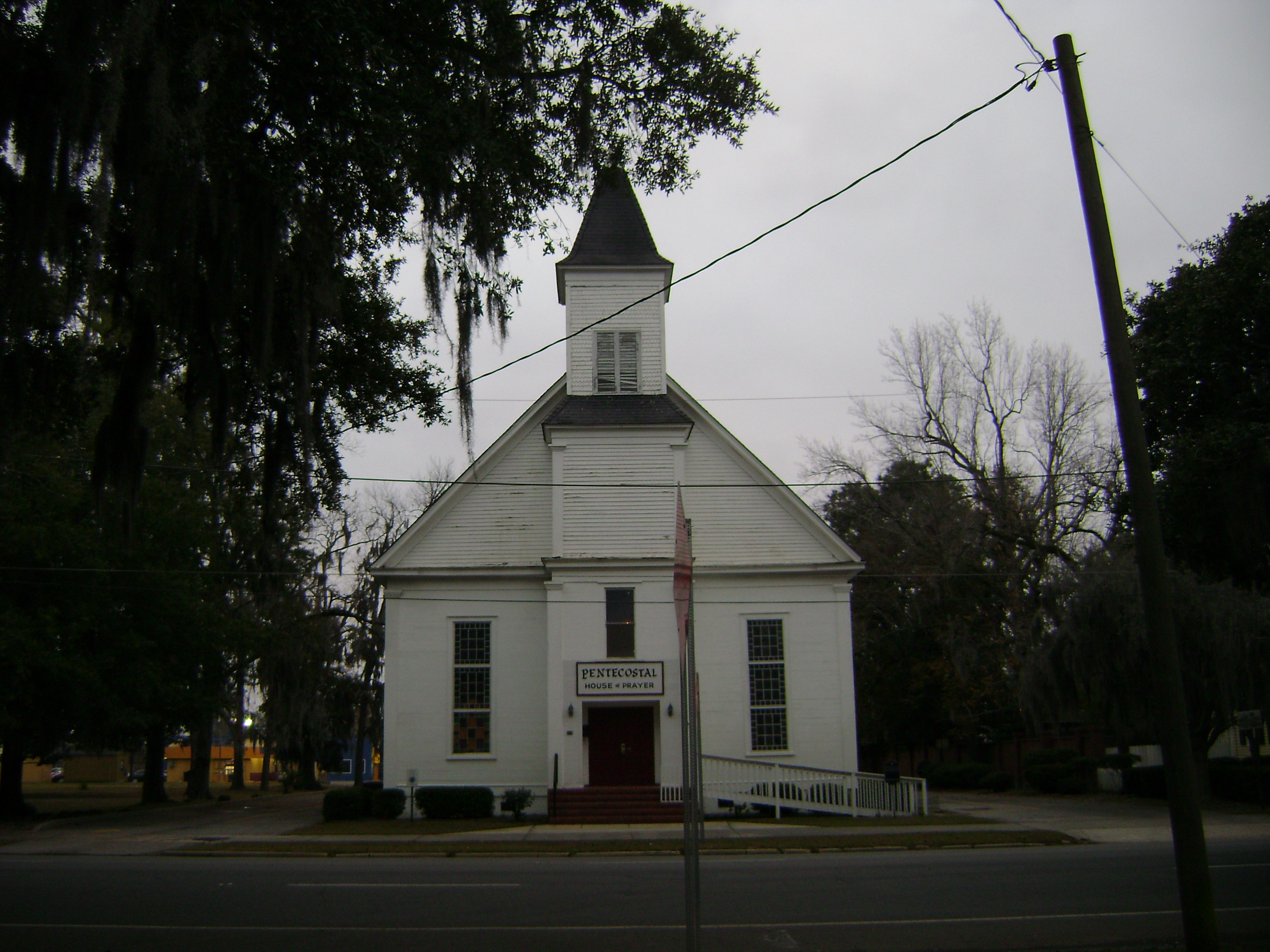
- Pentecostal House of Prayer, in the district

- Location within Georgia Location within the United States
- Location: NE of downtown Valdosta roughly bounded by North Ashley and E. Ann Sts., East Hill Ave., and Georgia and Florida RR, Valdosta, Georgia
- Coordinates: 30.838611°N 83.273611°W
- Area: 255 acres (1.03 km^{2})
- Architect: Lloyd Greer
- Architectural style: Queen Anne, Colonial Revival
- NRHP reference No.: 05000427
- Added to NRHP: May 21, 2005

The East End Historic District in Valdosta, Georgia is a 255 acres (1.03 km^{2}) historic district which was listed on the National Register of Historic Places in 2005. The district is northeast of downtown Valdosta and is roughly bounded by North Ashley and E. Ann Sts., East Hill Ave., and the Georgia and Florida Railroad tracks. The district included 470 contributing buildings, a contributing structure, and a contributing site.

It includes Smith Park.

It includes work by local architect Lloyd Greer and it includes Queen Anne and Colonial Revival architecture.
