= Lowndes County Courthouse (Georgia) =

- U.S. National Register of Historic Places
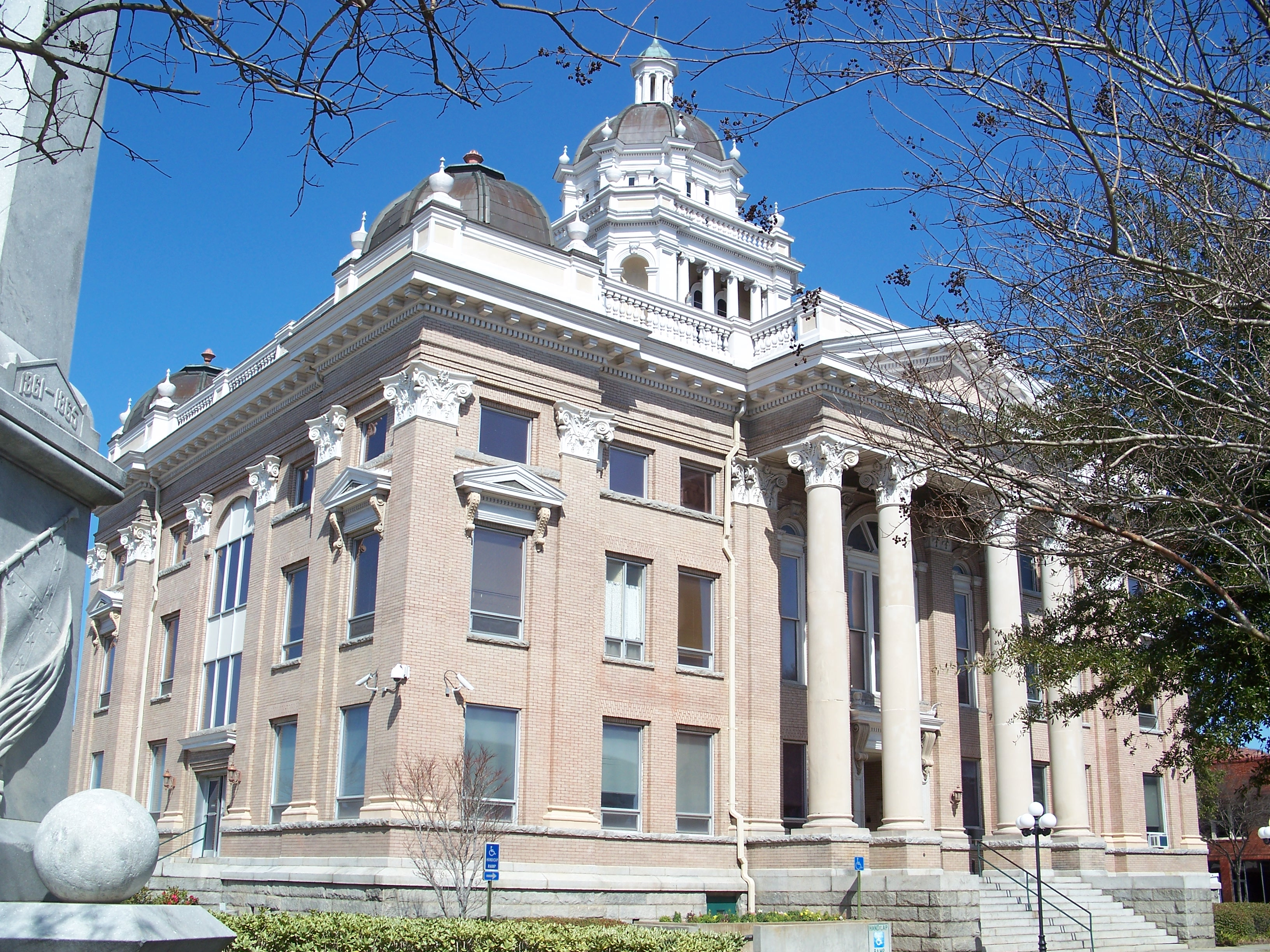

- Location within Georgia Location within the United States
- Interactive map showing the location of Lowndes County Courthouse
- Location: Central and Ashley Sta., Valdosta, Georgia
- Coordinates: 30°49′57″N 83°16′45″W
- Area: 1.1 acres (0.45 ha)
- Built: 1904-1905
- Built by: Algernon Blair
- Architect: Frank P. Mulburn
- Architectural style: Classical Revival
- MPS: Georgia County Courthouses TR
- NRHP reference No.: 80001110
- Added to NRHP: September 18, 1980

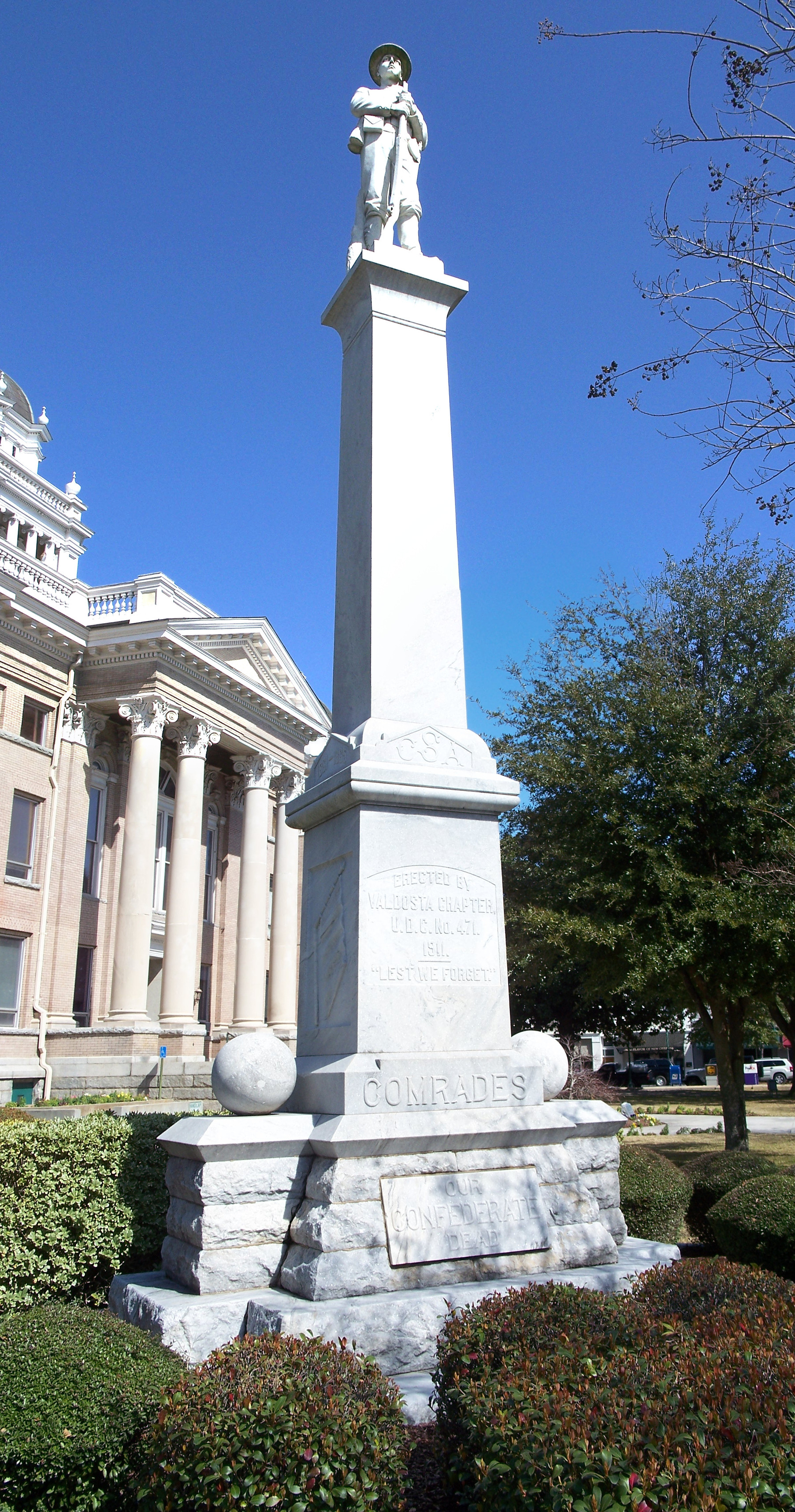
Monument to Confederate soldiers who perished, located in front of Lowndes County Courthouse

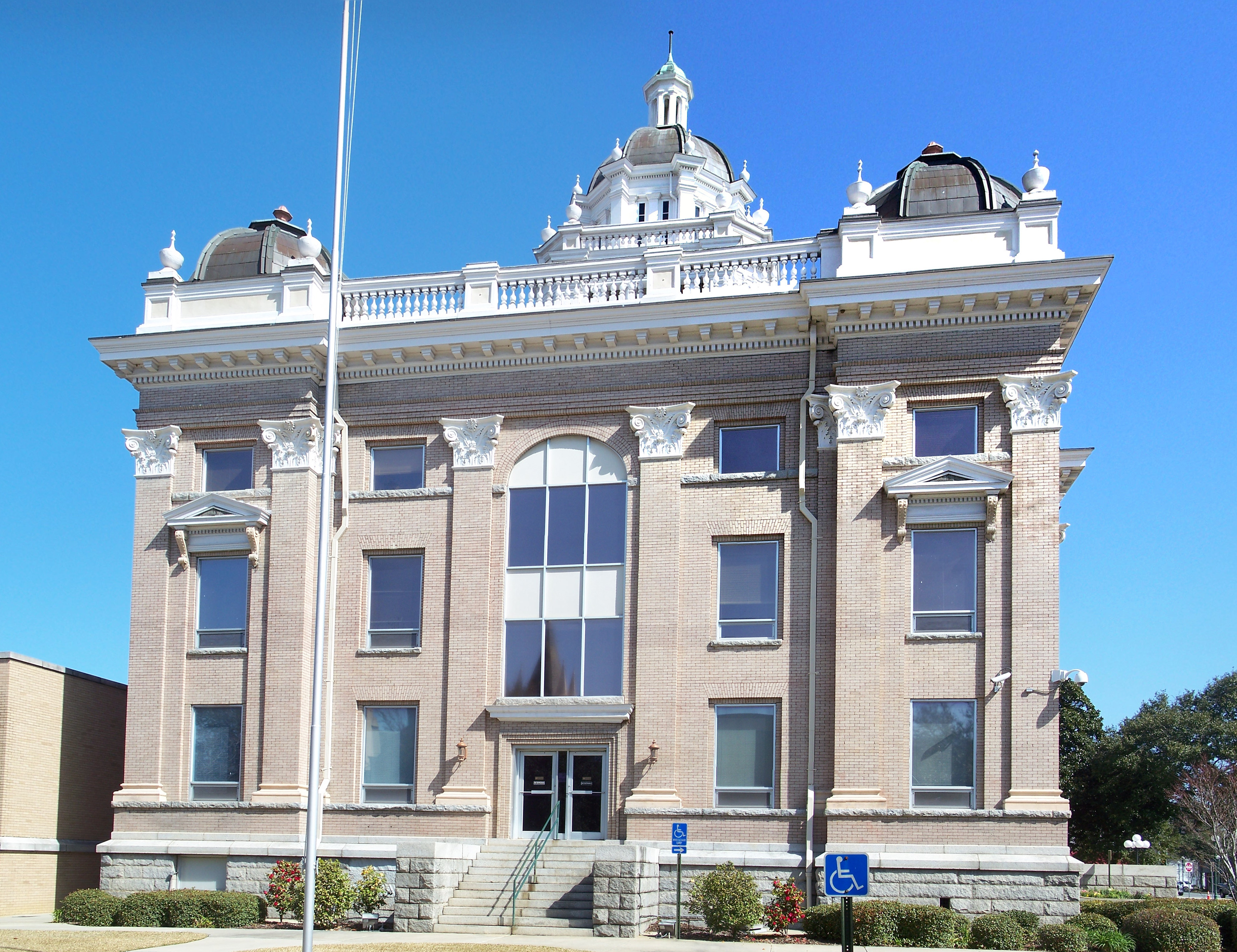
Rear or side view of the Lowndes County Courthouse

Lowndes County Courthouse is a historic county courthouse building in Valdosta, Georgia. It was designed by Frank P. Milburn and completed in 1905. It was added to the National Register of Historic Places on September 18, 1980. It is located at Central and Ashley streets.

== Monuments and time capsule ==
Several monuments are located around the courthouse including a memorial to Civil War Confederate soldiers who died. This monument is located on the corner of Patterson Street and Central Avenue and was funded by the Valdosta chapter (no. 471) of the United Daughters of the Confederacy (U.D.C.) in 1911. There are also smaller monuments and memorials to veterans of all wars put up by the American Legion, Valdosta Post no. 13 and dedicated on Veterans Day November 11, 1969; a memorial to "those defending the spirit of America" on September 11, 2001; a time capsule monument from July 8, 1976, in celebration of the United States Bicentennial and Lowndes County Sesquicentennial to be opened July 4, 2026; and a memorial built in 1949 in memory of Spanish–American War veterans by the J.O. Varnedoe Camp no. 40 U.S.W.V. and friends.

== See also ==
- National Register of Historic Places listings in Lowndes County, Georgia
