= Dasher High School =

- U.S. National Register of Historic Places
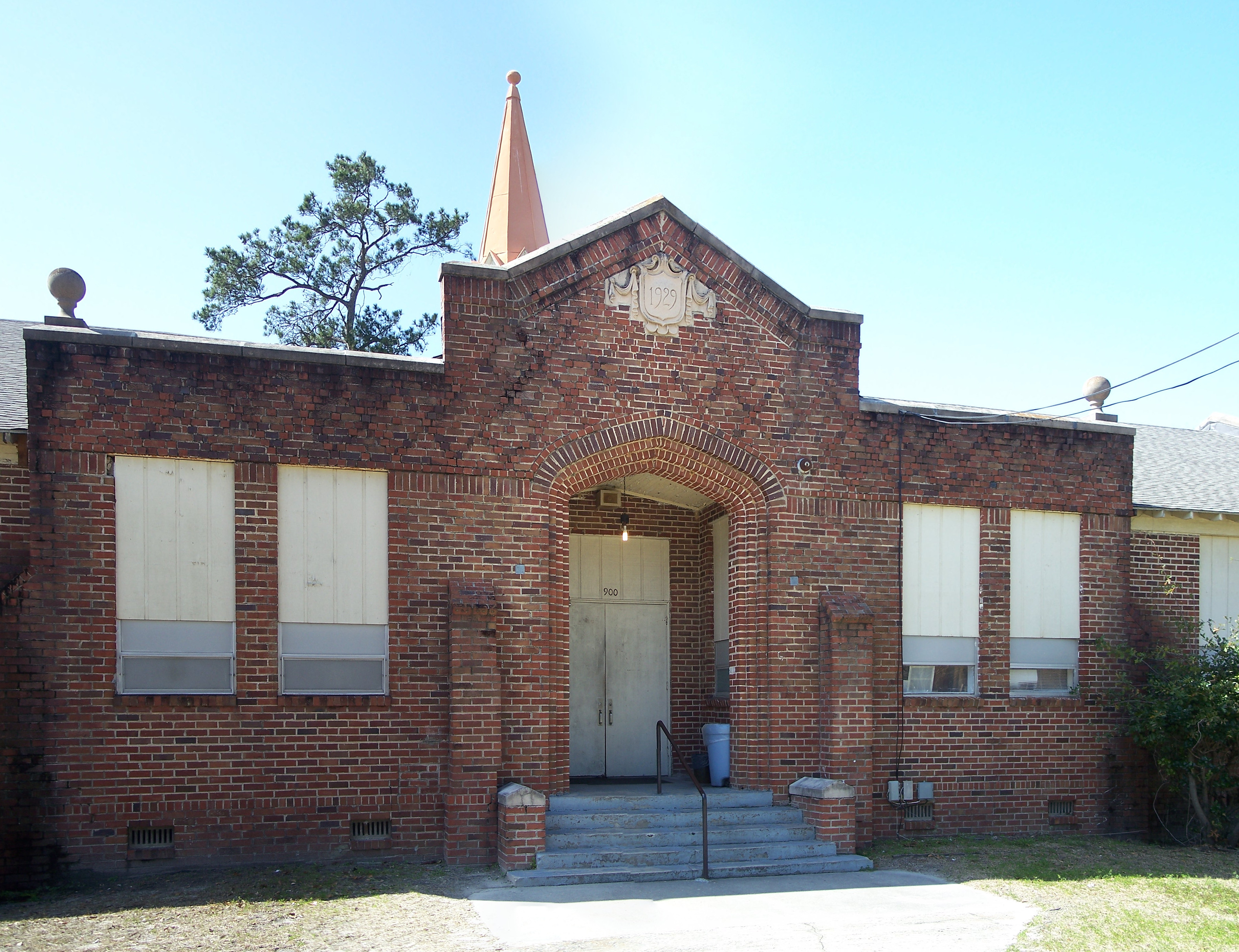

- Location within Georgia Location within the United States
- Location: 900 S. Troup St., Valdosta, Georgia
- Coordinates: 30°49′13″N 83°16′09″W
- Area: 4 acres (1.6 ha)
- Built: 1929
- Architect: Greer, Lloyd; Bray, J.N., Co.
- Architectural style: Tudoresque
- NRHP reference No.: 85000849
- Added to NRHP: April 18, 1985

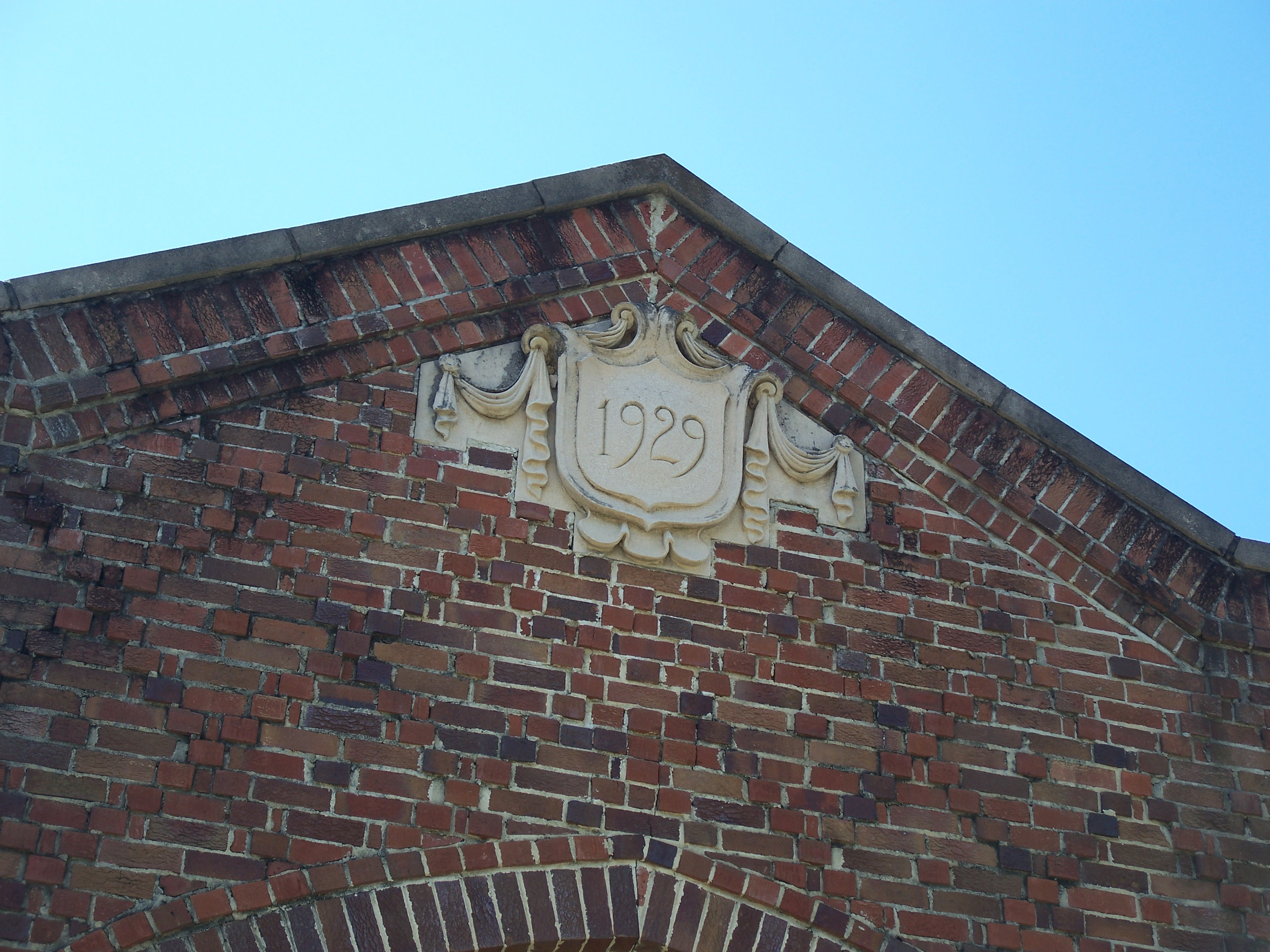
Detail

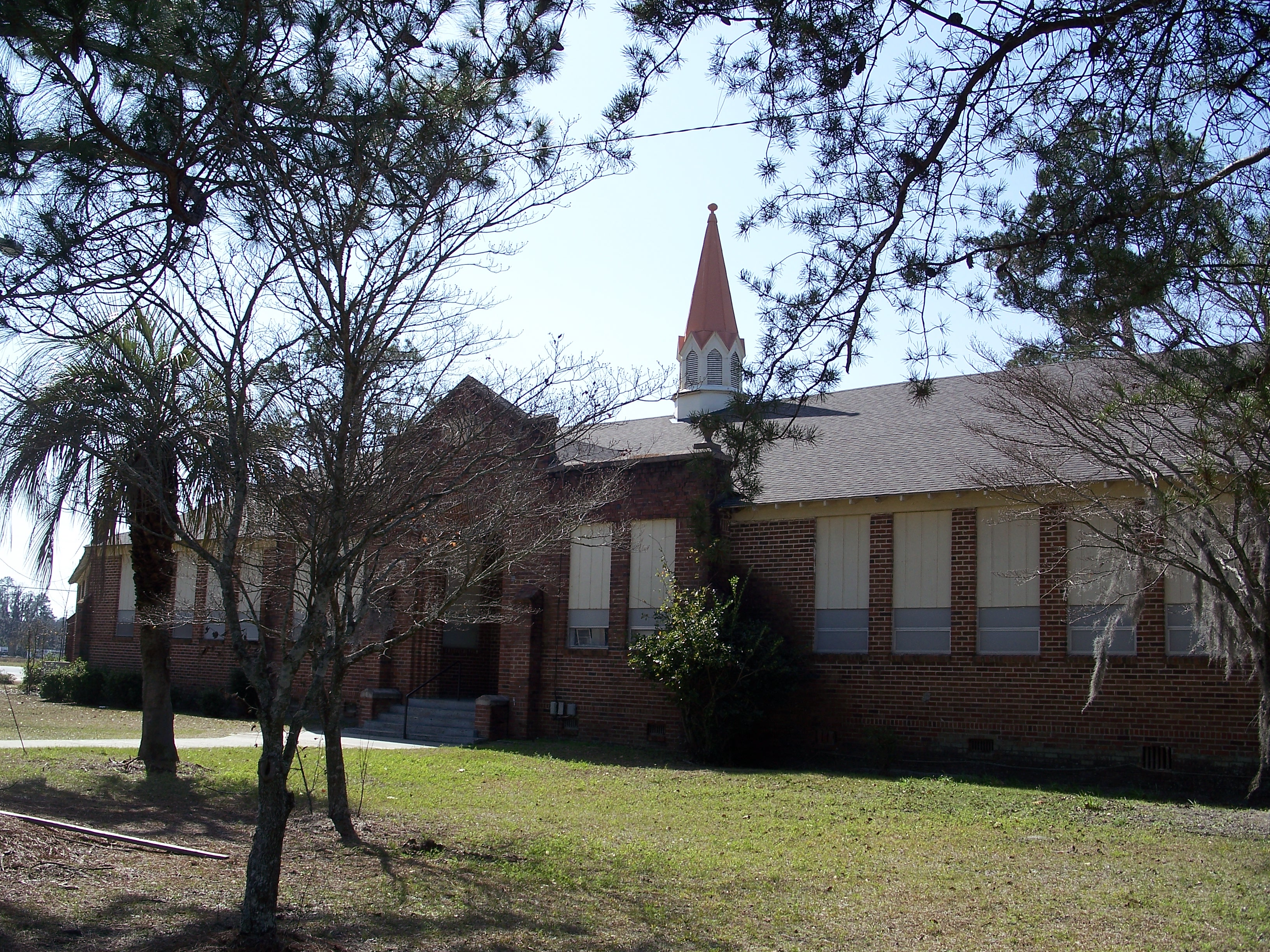
Valdosta Dasher School

Dasher High School is a historic school in Valdosta, Georgia, United States that served African Americans.

Inscribed 1929 in its cornerstone, the school was a high school for African Americans. James L. Lomax, a leader in African American education in Valdosta, served as the school's principal until his retirement in 1967. His adopted son Louis L. Lomax, the first African American broadcast journalist, attended Dasher High School. He was a civil rights activist and died in a car accident in 1970.

The school's football team won a Georgia Interscholastic Association Class A football championship in 1953.

The building was listed on the National Register of Historic Places on April 18, 1985. It is located at 900 South Troup Street.

== See also ==
- National Register of Historic Places listings in Lowndes County, Georgia
