= Crestwood (Valdosta, Georgia) =

Historic house in Georgia, United States

- U.S. National Register of Historic Places
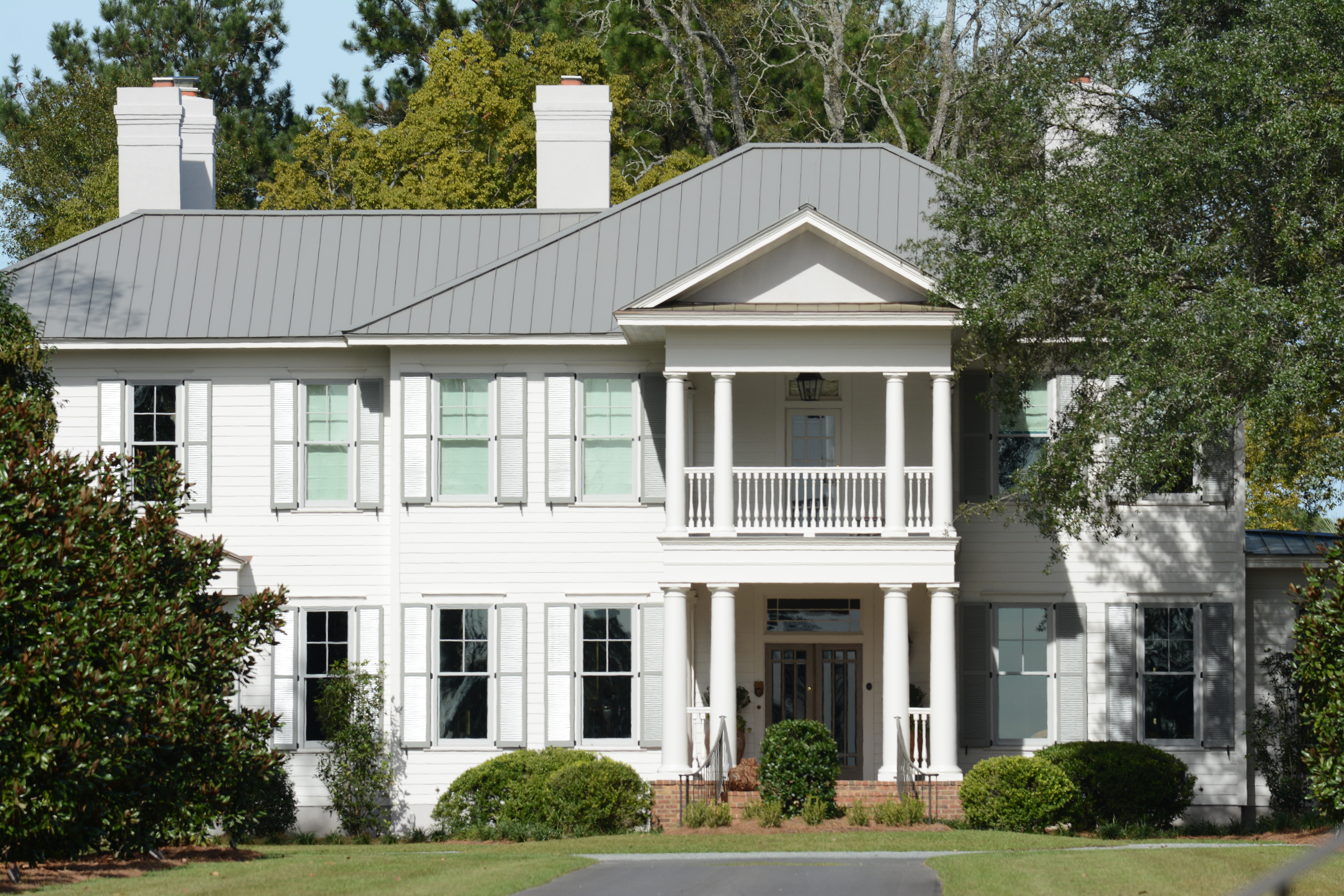
- Crestwood in 2015

- Location within Georgia Location within the United States
- Location: 502 Eager Rd., Valdosta, Georgia
- Coordinates: 30.87047°N 83.30272°W
- Area: 12.4 acres (5.0 ha)
- Built: 1915
- Built by: William G. Eager, Sr.
- Architectural style: Classical Revival
- NRHP reference No.: 84001147
- Added to NRHP: January 12, 1984

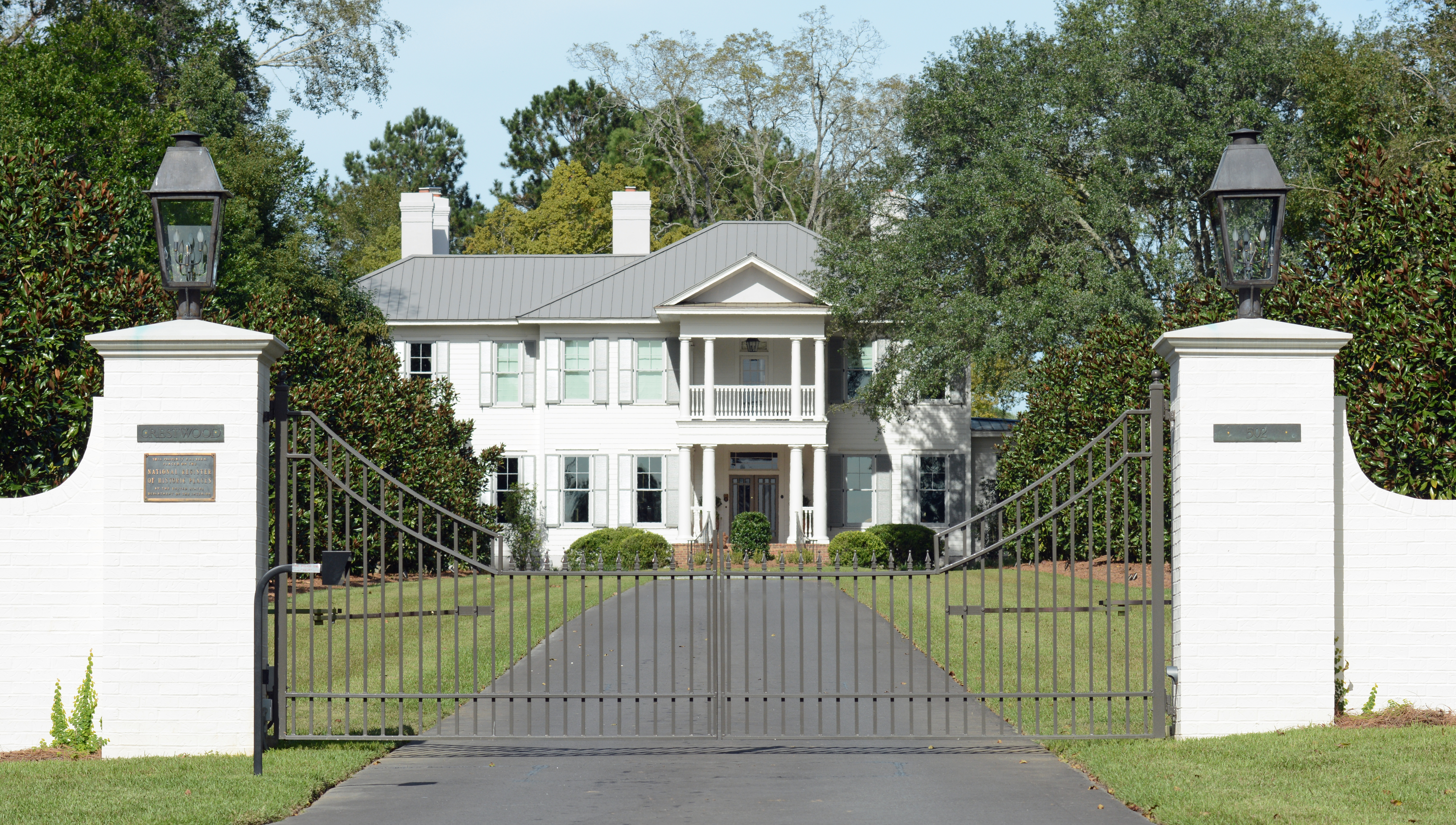
View from the street

Crestwood is a historic home in Valdosta, Georgia. It was added to the National Register of Historic Places on January 12, 1984. It is located at 502 Eager Road. The home was designed by William G. Eager and built in 1915. The home includes five bedrooms and four bathrooms on 2.51 acres. It was for sale in 2013. The columns and some other materials were salvaged from partially burned home at 701 North Patterson Street. Crestwood's west wing was added in 1928. It includes a library, two bedrooms upstairs, a bathroom, and closets. The home was renovated and the kitchen updated in 1982 according to designs by Richard Hill of Valdosta. The home was part of a pecan plantation. It includes a two-story columned portico and a porte-cochere on the east side. The library has a large limestone fireplace.

William Eager designed a sawed-off shotgun used in trench warfare during World War I.

Its front yard remained a pecan grove in 1983.

== See also ==
- National Register of Historic Places listings in Lowndes County, Georgia
