= First Presbyterian Church (Valdosta, Georgia) =

Historic church in Georgia, United States

- U.S. National Register of Historic Places
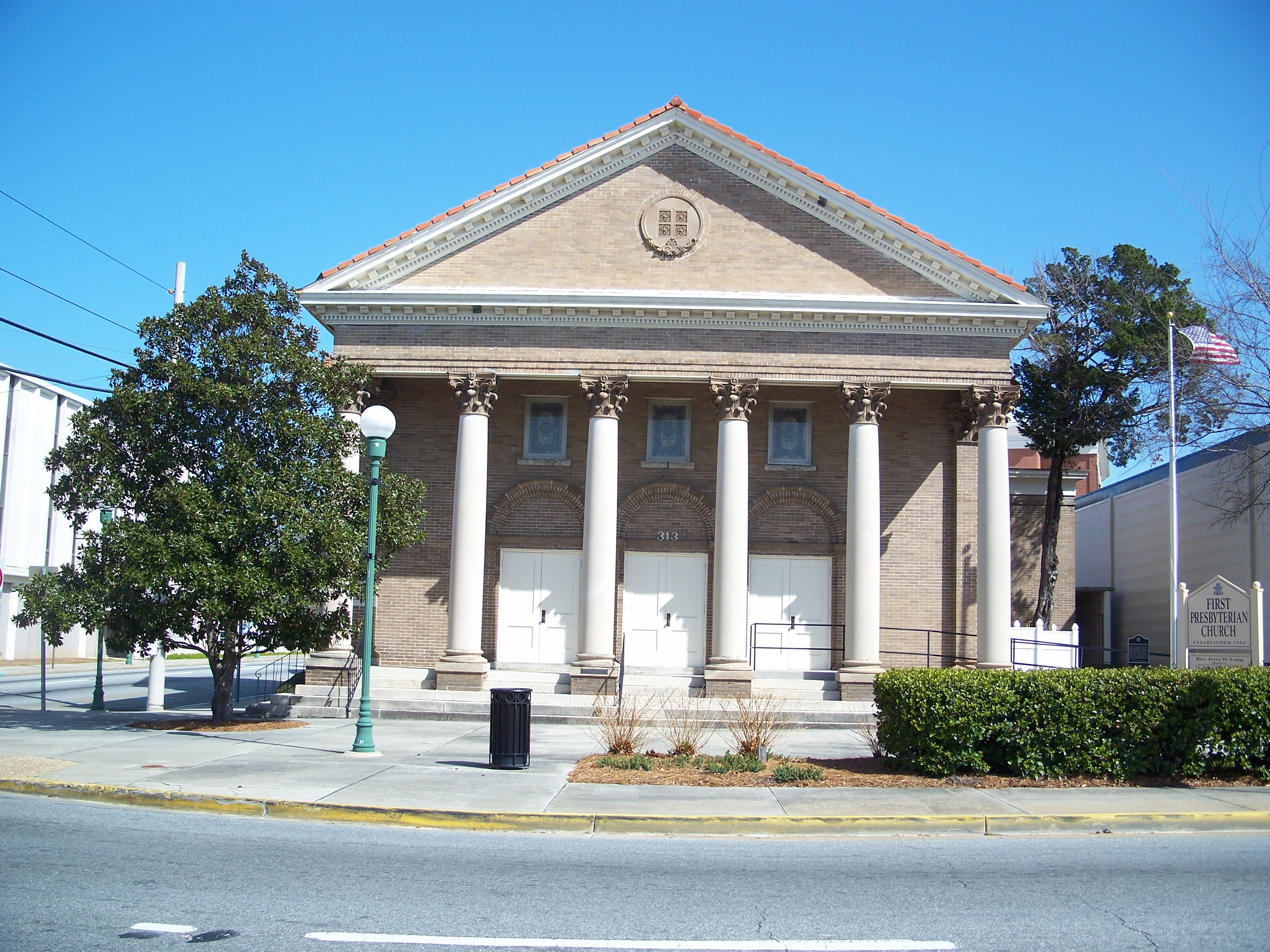

- Location within Georgia Location within the United States
- Location: 313 N. Patterson St., Valdosta, Georgia
- Coordinates: 30°50′3″N 83°16′10″W
- Area: 0.5 acres (0.20 ha)
- Built: 1910
- Built by: Shaw, M.E.
- Architect: Butt & Morris
- Architectural style: Classical Revival
- NRHP reference No.: 87001912
- Added to NRHP: November 2, 1987

The First Presbyterian Church in Valdosta, Georgia is a historic Presbyterian church that was built in 1910. It is located at 313 N. Patterson Street.

It was added to the National Register of Historic Places in 1987.

It is the only Classical Revival-style church in Valdosta and was designed by Atlanta architects James W. Butt (d. 1914) and Marshall F. Morris (d. 1921). The church's front facade, on Patterson Street, has a portico with six Corinthian columns, with dentils and modillions in its cornice and pediment, and decorative terra cotta in the tympanum. It also has two pedimented cross-gabled pavilions with dentils and modillions on its Magnolia Street facade.

Butt & Norris also designed the Thomas P. Arnold House in Palmetto, Georgia, which also is NRHP-listed.
