= Brookwood North Historic District =

Historic district in Georgia, United States

- U.S. National Register of Historic Places
- U.S. Historic district
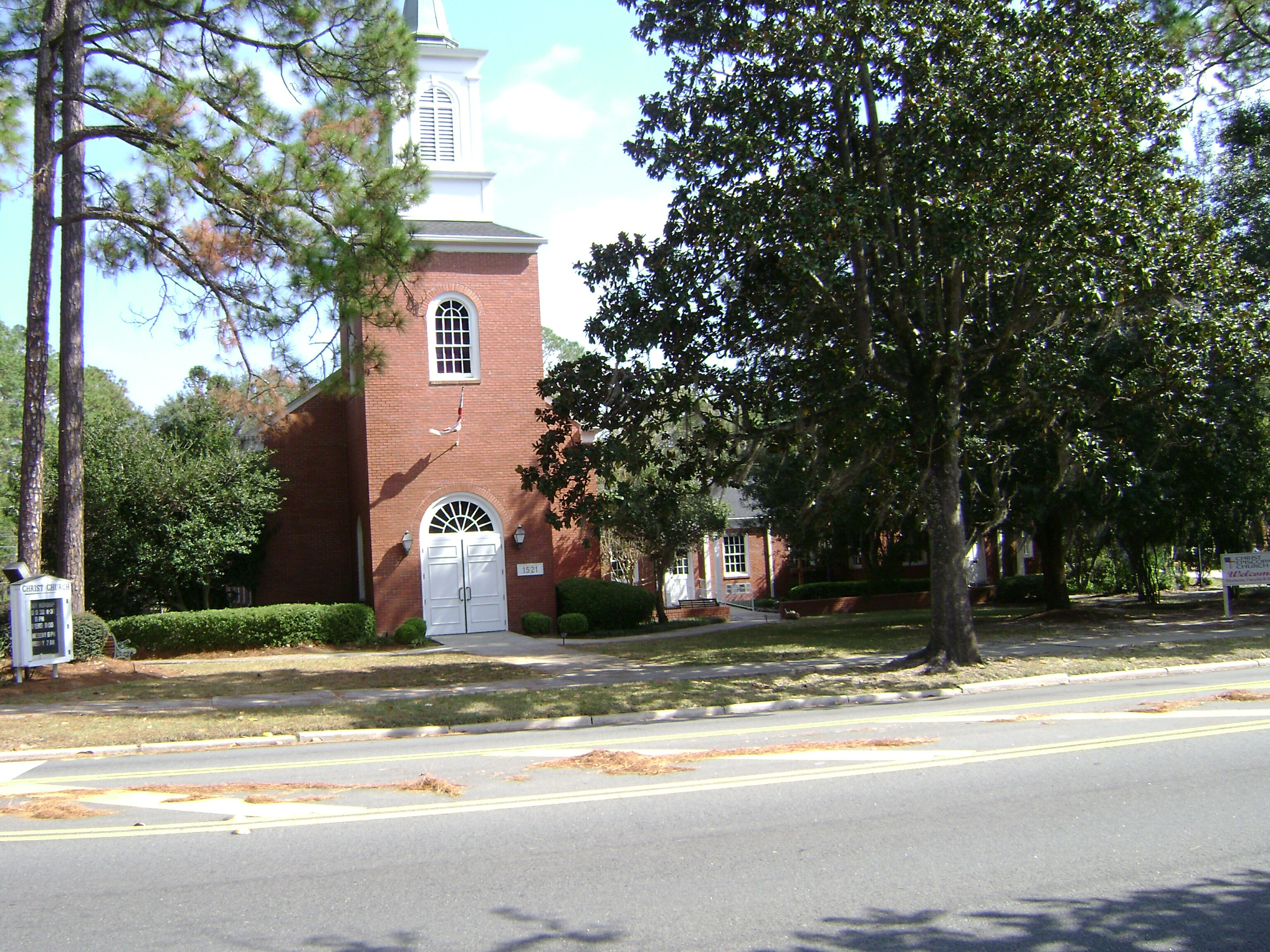
- Christ Episcopal Church, at 1521 N Patterson St. in the district

- Location within Georgia Location within the United States
- Location: Roughly bounded by Patterson St., Georgia Ave., Oak St., Park Ave., Williams St. and Brookwood Dr., Valdosta, Georgia
- Coordinates: 30.851667°N 83.287778°W
- Area: 175 acres (0.71 km^{2})
- Architect: Lloyd B. Greer, Felton Davis
- Architectural style: Late 19th And 20th Century Revivals, Late 19th And Early 20th Century American Movements
- NRHP reference No.: 95000684
- Added to NRHP: June 2, 1995

Brookwood North Historic District in Valdosta, Georgia is a historic district which was listed on the National Register of Historic Places in 1995. The listing included 218 contributing buildings and a contributing site, as well as 88 non-contributing buildings. Its 175 acres (0.71 km^{2}) area is roughly bounded by Patterson St., Georgia Ave., Oak St., Park Ave., Williams St. and Brookwood Dr.

The district includes architectural work by Lloyd B. Greer, Felton Davis, and others. It includes 48 homes designed by Greer, a local Valdosta architect, including his own home at 114 Alden Street. Three English Vernacular Revival-style houses by him, named "Faith", "Hope", and "Charity" are along East Alden and have large front-gabled facades and steeply pitched roofs. Another of Greer's works is the International-style house at 1407 Williams Street.

It includes the entirety of three areas developed as subdivisions:

- Pine Park/Victory Subdivision, developed in 1921, a four-block area north of East Alden
- Moore-West Land Company, developed in 1923, area of Patterson St., Georgia Ave., and Park Ave.
- Dasher-West Subdivision, developed in 1927.
