= Lloyd Greer =

American architect

Lloyd B. Greer was an American architect who practiced in Valdosta, Georgia during the first half of the twentieth century. A number of the many hundreds of buildings that he is credited with designing are listed on the U.S. National Register of Historic Places.

Greer's birthplace has been variously reported as Tallapoosa, Georgia, and Iron City, Alabama. Ray Cumrine, who authored an unpublished study of Greer and his works, of which a copy is on file at the Lowndes County Historical Society in Valdosta, stated that "Lloyd Barton Greer was born in Iron City, Alabama, of Joseph Autry Greer and Julia Barton Teague Greer." According to Cumrine, Greer was born on 6 August 1885 and moved with his family to Atlanta, Georgia, in 1893. Greer was partly home-schooled before graduating from Atlanta's Tech High School. He entered Georgia Tech in 1900 and graduated with a degree in architecture in 1903. Greer received subsequent training in the Atlanta firm of Hentz & Reid. Still according to Cumrine, from 1912 he represented that firm on the sites of various projects in northern Florida and southern Georgia before resigning in 1915 to set up his own practice in Valdosta. However, the Valdosta City directory for 1913 shows him already practicing there as of that year under the style, Bishop & Greer.

He succumbed to complications of a heart attack on 26 September 1952.

== Works ==
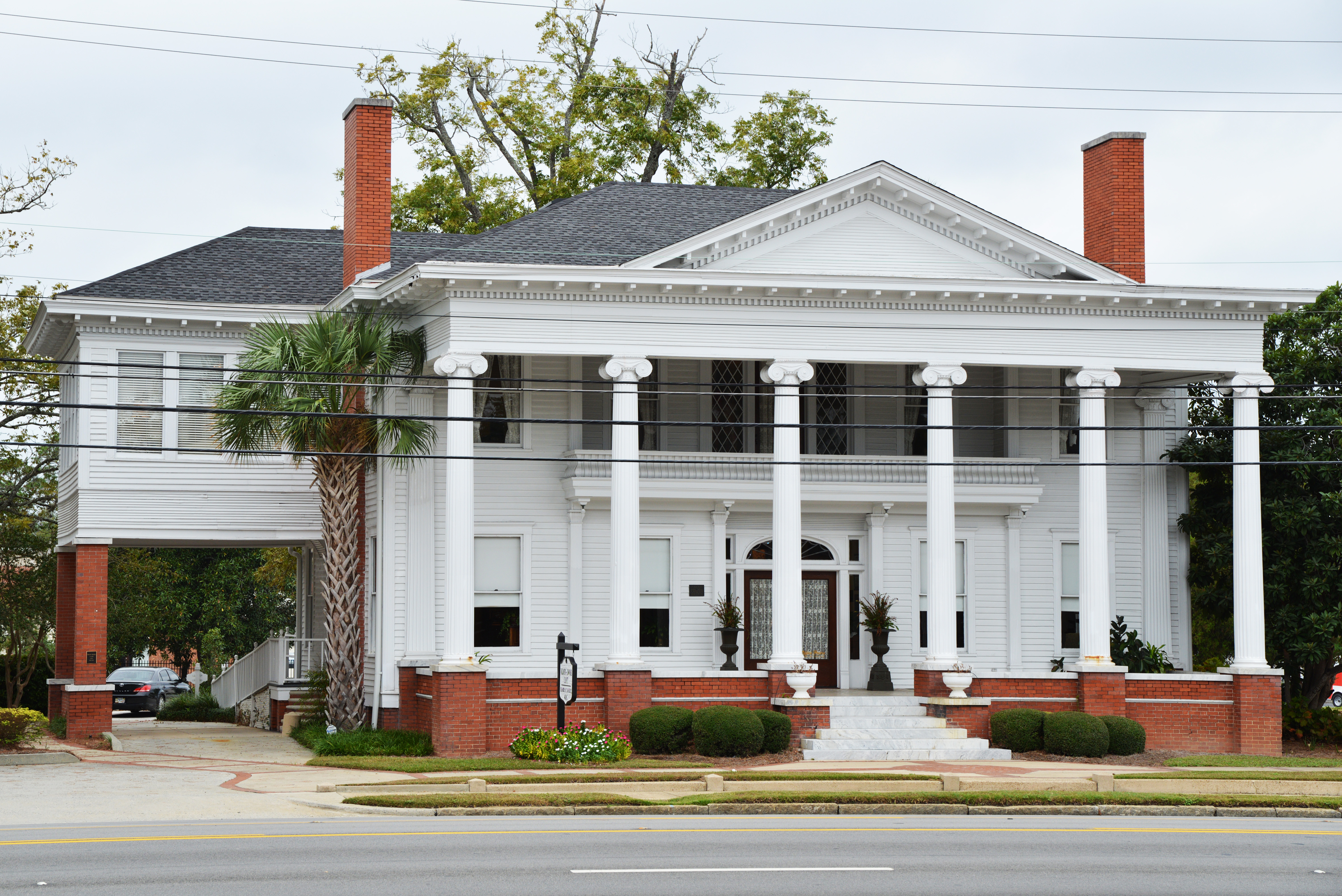
Barber-Pittman House

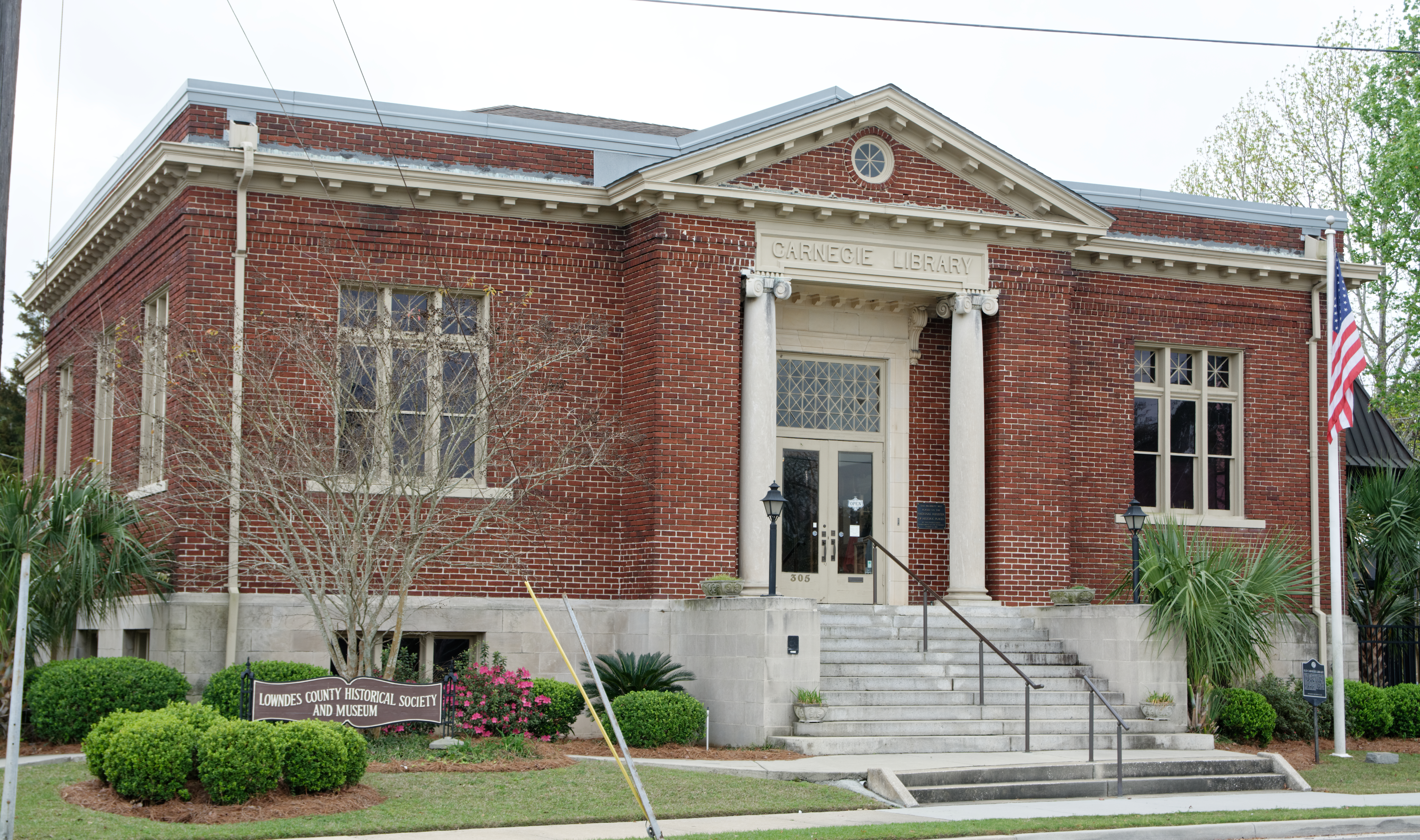
Carnegie Library of Valdosta

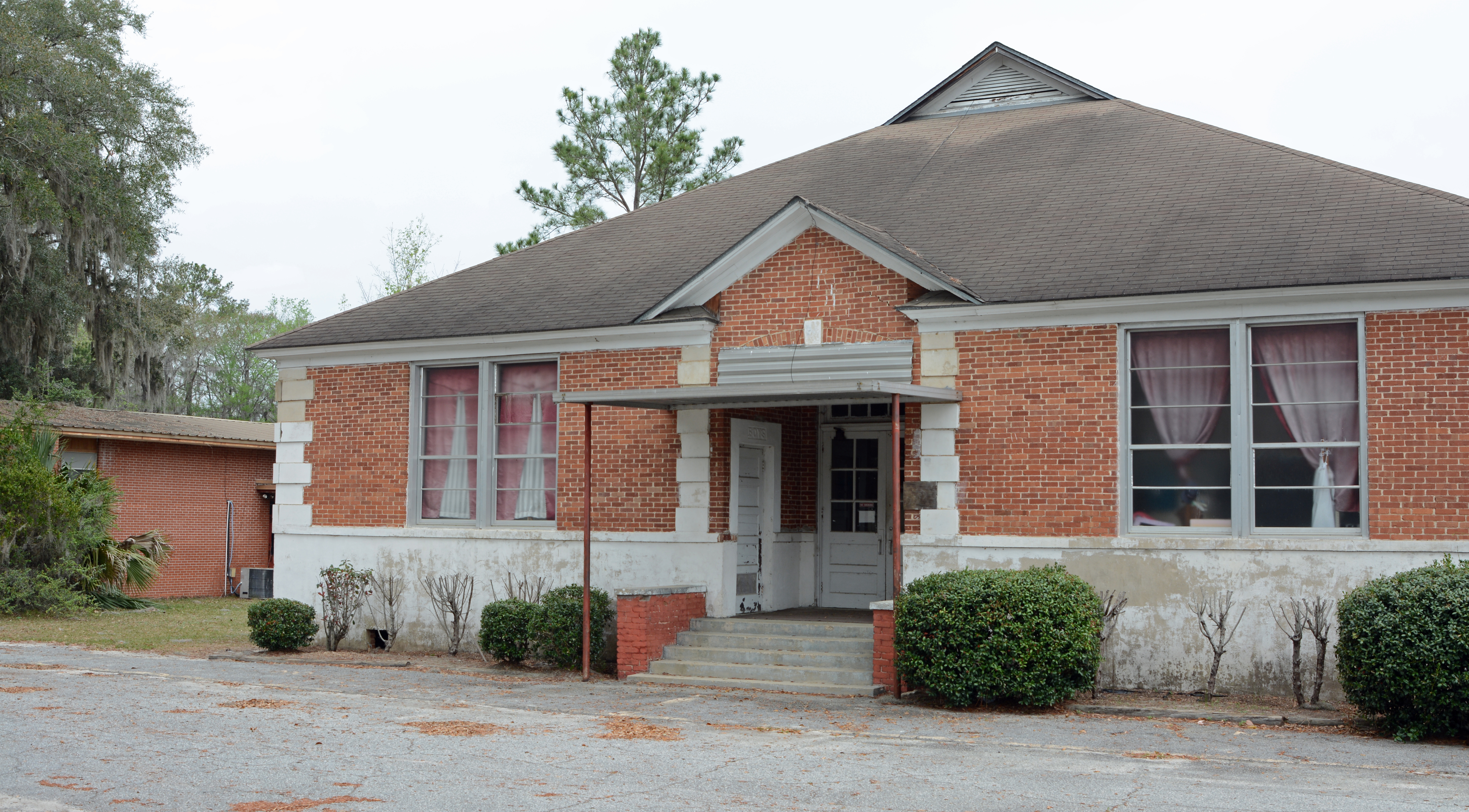
Lanier County School

- Barber-Pittman House, 416 N. Ashley St., Valdosta, Georgia, (Greer, Lloyd Barton), NRHP-listed
- Carnegie Library of Valdosta, 305 W. Central Ave., Valdosta, (Greer, Lloyd), NRHP-listed
- Dasher High School, 900 S. Troup St., Valdosta, (Greer, Lloyd), NRHP-listed
- 48 houses in Brookwood North Historic District, roughly bounded by Patterson St., Georgia Ave., Oak St., Park Ave., Williams St. and Brookwood Dr., Valdosta, (Greer, Lloyd B.), NRHP-listed These include his own home at 114 Alden Street, and three English Vernacular Revival-style houses by him, named "Faith", "Hope", and "Charity" along East Alden, and the International-style house at 1407 Williams Street.
- One or more works in East End Historic District, NE of downtown Valdosta roughly bounded by North Ashley and E. Ann Sts., East Hill Ave., and Georgia and Florida RR, Valdosta (Greer, Lloyd), NRHP-listed
- One or more works in Southside Historic District, roughly bounded by CSX tracks, Bunche Dr., Griffin Ave., Old Statenville Rd., Wisenbaker Ln, Dasher Ln., and S. Patterson R., Valdosta, (Greer, Lloyd), NRHP-listed
- Lanier County Auditorium and Grammar School, E. Church Ave., Lakeland, Georgia, (Greer, Lloyd), NRHP-listed
- James Price McRee House, 181 E. Broad St., Camilla, Georgia, (Greer, Lloyd), NRHP-listed
- Statenville Consolidated School, GA 94, Statenville, Georgia, (Greer, Lloyd), NRHP-listed
