= Southside Historic District (Valdosta, Georgia) =

Historic district in Georgia, United States

- U.S. National Register of Historic Places
- U.S. Historic district
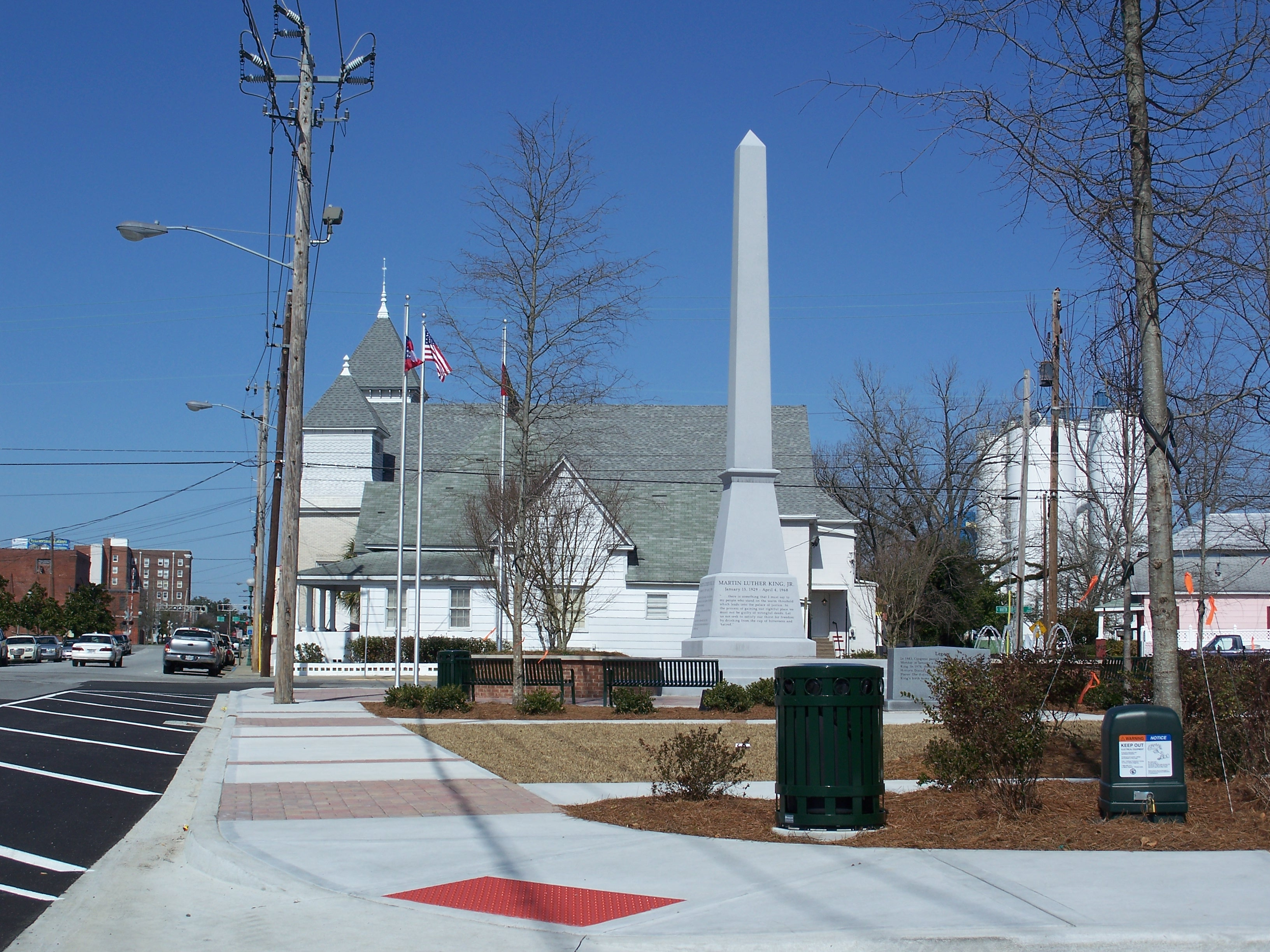

- Location within Georgia Location within the United States
- Location: Roughly bounded by CSX tracks, Bunche Dr., Griffin Ave., Old Statenville Rd., Wisenbake Ln, Dasher Ln., and S. Patterson R, Valdosta, Georgia
- Area: 202 acres (82 ha)
- Built: 1874
- Architect: Lloyd Greer and others
- Architectural style: Bungalow/craftsman, Art Deco, et al.
- NRHP reference No.: 07000379
- Added to NRHP: April 27, 2007

The Southside Historic District in Valdosta, Georgia is a 202-acre (82 ha) historic district that was listed on the National Register of Historic Places in 2007.

The neighborhood developed as an African-American area. The district included 421 contributing buildings, two other contributing structures, and 283 non-contributing buildings.
