= Barber-Pittman House =

Historic house in Georgia, United States

- U.S. National Register of Historic Places
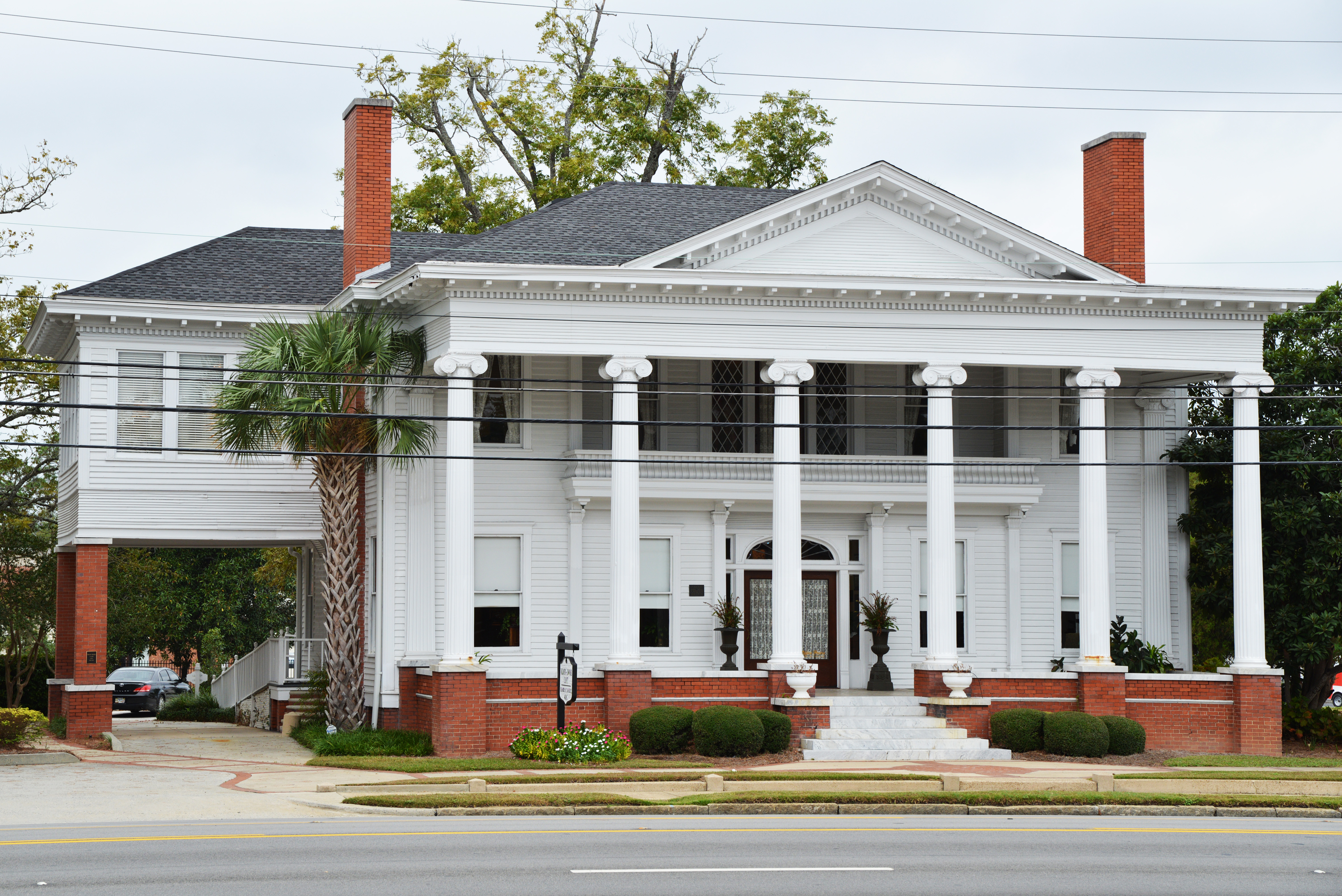

- Location within Georgia Location within the United States
- Location: 416 N. Ashley St., Valdosta, Georgia
- Coordinates: 30°50′7″N 83°16′47″W
- Area: less than one acre
- Built: 1915
- Architect: Lloyd Barton Greer
- Architectural style: Neo-classical
- NRHP reference No.: 80001108
- Added to NRHP: February 12, 1980

The Barber-Pittman House in Valdosta, Georgia was built in 1915. It was a work of architect Lloyd Barton Greer. The house was built for E.R. Barber, who was both an inventor and the first Coca-Cola bottler located outside Atlanta. The builder's daughter, Ola Barber Pittman, gave the house to the citizens of Valdosta on the condition that the house would not be sold. The house was restored and is used as the headquarters for the Valdosta-Lowndes Chamber of Commerce. It was listed on the National Register of Historic Places in 1980. The listing included three contributing buildings.
