= The Crescent (Valdosta, Georgia) =

Historic house in Georgia, United States

- Crescent, The
- U.S. National Register of Historic Places
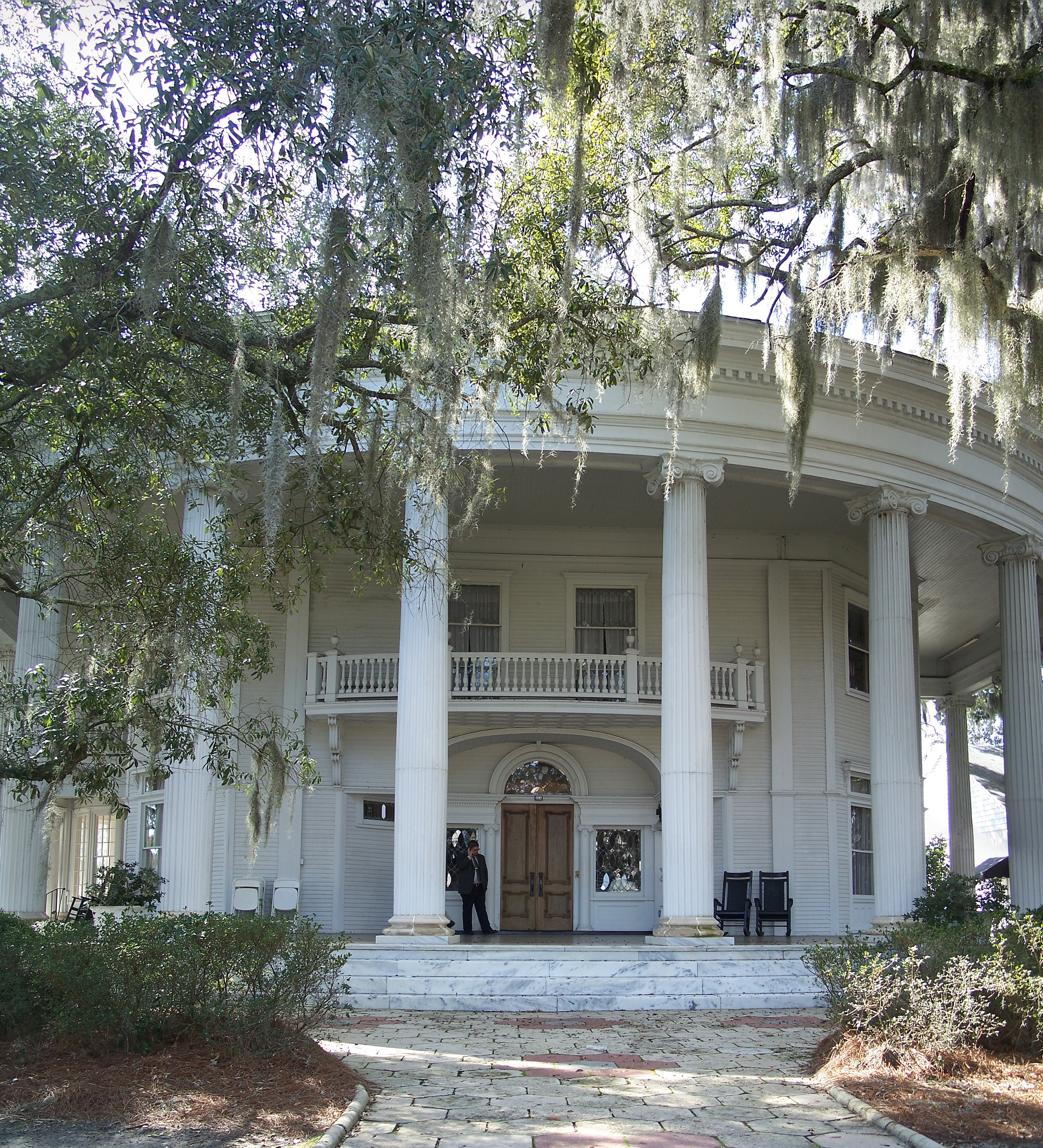

- Location within Georgia
- Location: 904 N. Patterson St., Valdosta, Georgia
- Coordinates: 30°50′22″N 83°17′2″W
- Area: 1.7 acres (0.69 ha)
- Built: 1900
- Architect: Bleckley & Tyler
- Architectural style: Neoclassical
- NRHP reference No.: 80001109
- Added to NRHP: January 8, 1980

The Crescent, at 904 N. Patterson St. in Valdosta in Lowndes County, Georgia, is a Neoclassical house built in 1898. It was listed on the National Register of Historic Places in 1980.

It is a three-story building with a monumental two-story semi-circular portico. It was designed by Atlanta architects Bleckley & Tyler and has also been known as the Colonel William S. West House.
