= List of buildings at Valdosta State University =

Buildings at Valdosta State University

The Valdosta State University campus is divided into two areas: main campus, which houses much of the academic and administrative departments, and north campus, which primarily houses the Langdale College of Business.

Buildings on the Main Campus are modeled in Spanish Mission architecture using terra stucco construction and terra cotta roofs, and are surrounded by picturesque landscaping featuring palms, pines, azaleas, camelias and a mix of other beautiful flowering plants. It features an attractive pedestrian mall of inlaid brick and well-designed seating areas. The Rea and Lillian Steele North Campus is home to the Harley Langdale Jr. School of Business and Air Force ROTC Detachment 172, and is less than a mile north of VSU's main campus. The buildings follow a red brick modified form of Georgian architecture.

== Main Campus ==
Building	Construction Date	Description	Image
Ashley Hall	1921	Built as a dormitory for the South Georgia State Normal College, it was named Ashley Hall for C.R. Ashley, the Treasurer of the Board of Trustees in 1923. Ashley Hall is now occupied by the Department of History, the Department of Philosophy, other faculty offices, and the Division of Information Technology.	
Athletic Field House	2008		
Education Center	1971	Dedicated in 1973 it houses several departments of the James L. and Dorothy H. Dewar College of Education and provides the most modern facilities for training teachers, school administrators, and other specialists in education.	
Farbar Hall	1962	Former Student Health Clinic. Currently houses FamilyWorks Clinic and Marriage and Family Therapy program.	
Fine Arts Building	1969	Home to the Department of Art and the Department of Music. The Whitehead Auditorium is named in honor of the late Mr. and Mrs. W. Q. Whitehead of Emanuel County, Georgia.	
"House in the Woods"	18?? or 19?? and 1939	The building predated the establishment of South Georgia State Normal College. It was originally a tenement house and burned down. The WPA built a new "House in the Woods" in 1939. It was a log cabin with two stone fireplaces. The building served a center for social activity. It was demolished in 1969 to make room for Langdale Hall. It was located near Farber Hall.	
Hugh C. Bailey Science Center	1998	Completed in 2001, Bailey Science Center provides offices, classrooms, and laboratories for the Department of Biology and the Department of Chemistry as well as offices for the Dean of the College of Arts and Sciences. The building was expanded in 2012 to add more office and lab spaces. The facility was named in 2005 in honor of former VSU President Hugh C. Bailey, who served the university for 23 years.	
Martin Hall	1977	S. Walter Martin Hall, acquired in 1985, is located on Patterson Street across from University Center. This modern facility houses the STEAM Center.	
Nevins Hall	1966	Nevins houses the offices of the Vice President for Student Affairs; offices, classrooms, and laboratories of the Departments of Physics, Astronomy, and Geosciences (including the observatory and planetarium); Mathematics and Computer Science; Communication Arts; African American Studies; and Strategic Research & Analysis. This building is named in honor of the late Dr. Beatrice I. Nevins, head of the biology department for many years.	
Odum Library	1970	Odum Library contains the general and research library collections of the University. The building was dedicated in 1972 and named in 1990 for the late Gertrude Gilmer Odum, Professor Emerita of English. In 2004 a new addition opened, doubling the size of the library and adding an Internet Café, an auditorium, additional computer labs, classrooms, and a new archives section. The collection contains over 515,793 bound volumes and over a million volumes in microforms, as well as current issues of 2,774 magazines, journals, and newspapers. The Odum Library is a Selective Depository of U.S. Government documents and maintains the Archives of Contemporary South Georgia History and a Southern History Collection.	
Oak Street Parking Deck	2008	A multi-layer parking structure that was completed after the Hayden Barnes controversy. The structure also houses several campus offices including those for the University Police.	
Old Gymnasium	19??	The Old Gymnasium was the location for physical education classes before a new complex was completed in 1982. It was demolished in 2008 to make room for a new Student Union. It stood where the ballrooms and campus bookstore section of the current Student Union now stand.	
Palms Dining Hall	1955	VSU's primary dining facility opened in 1955 with a seating capacity of 500 people and was equipped with cafeteria-style serving. The building was renovated in 1969, and increased capacity to 1000 diners. In 1987, the building was renamed Palms Dining Center. The interior of Palms was renovated again in 2006 when Sodexo Campus Services became the university's food service provider.	
The PE Complex	1979	Completed in the Spring of 1982, this modern facility seats 5,500 people for basketball and 6,000 for graduations and concerts. The building of 100,000 square feet (9,300 m^{2}) contains the offices of the Physical Education faculty and all Athletic offices except football. Classrooms, a Health Fitness Center, athletic training room, varsity and physical education dressing rooms for men and women, and a Human Performance Laboratory are also included.	
Pine Hall	1947	Located southwest of Odum Library, Pine Hall provides offices for the Division of Social Work and the Office of Public Safety.	
Powell Hall	1939	Dedicated by Mrs. Eleanor Roosevelt in 1941 as Georgia State Women's College Library and officially named for Richard Holmes Powell, the first president of the institution, in 1947. It served as the library for the college for 30 years before Odum Library was constructed. Powell now houses an auditorium, the offices of Career Services, Co-op Education, Testing, Housing, the Counseling Center, and Alcohol and Other Drug Education.	
Psychology Building	2011	Located on the original site of Converse Hall and occasionally still referred to as Converse Hall, the building houses Psychology and Counseling Department, the Graduate School offices, and several classrooms.	
Special Education and Communications Disorders Building	2000	This $3.3 million facility is located across Patterson Street from the University Center on the site of the former Lily Building. The 24,000 square-foot building is two stories and features three technology classrooms, 11 therapy rooms, and a Speech and Language Hearing Clinic.	
Student Health Center	2009	The 27,000-square-foot (2,500 m^{2}) facility, which replaced the smaller, outdated Farber health building, contains a two-story lobby and waiting room, 18 exam rooms, three nurse stations, two observations rooms, a pharmacy, clinical lab, radiology suite and administration suite.	
Student Recreation Center	2002	The $9.75 million 67,641-square-foot (6,284.1 m^{2}) facility, located on Sustella Avenue, includes a lounge, an indoor swimming pool, indoor track, basketball and racquetball courts, a weight-lifting area, a climbing wall, and other recreational facilities for student use.	
Student Union	2010	The current student union, approximately 120,000 square feet (11,000 m^{2}), contains many amenities including a ballroom with seating for 540 and lecture seating capacity of 850. The space can also be divided into three smaller rooms to host multiple events simultaneously. As well as a theatre with seating for 350, meeting rooms, student organization and student government offices, administrative offices for the dean of students and student life, a two-story bookstore, game room, and a food court featuring a Nathan's Famous, The Loop Pizza Grill, and a Starbucks Coffee. The facility also offers abundant student lounge spaces throughout. The original University Union, dedicated in 1966 and expanded in 1976, contained the University snack bar, radio station WVVS, mail services, a swimming pool, the offices of the University Union Board, Student Government Association, the yearbook, and newspaper editorial offices.	
Sustella Parking Deck	2008	A multi-layer parking structure that was completed after the Hayden Barnes controversy. The structure also houses several campus offices including those for Campus Recreation Rental Center and Parking and Transportation.	
University Center	1995	Covering over 150,000 square feet (14,000 m^{2}) the 'U.C.' contains study rooms, computer labs, and dining area in the north section. The Central Section houses multiple administrative offices, art and dance studios, and faculty offices. And the south section houses the South Georgia Consortium; Internal Auditors; Office of Academic Student Instructional Support; the Department of Sociology, Anthropology, and Criminal Justice; and art and interior design studios. This set of linked buildings was originally the Brookwood Plaza shopping center, built in the early 1960s.	
West Hall	1918	As the oldest building at Valdosta State, West Hall has long been known as the symbol of the University. It houses numerous classrooms, the administrative offices of the President, the Vice President for Academic Affairs, the Associate Vice President for Strategic Research and Analysis, Legal Affairs, and the Departments of English, Political Science, Modern and Classical Languages. In addition, this building houses the Master’s of Public Administration Program, the Foreign Language/International Culture Center, the language laboratory, an electronic classroom, and the Campus Writing Center.	

=== Residence Halls ===
VSU students can live in one of nine residence halls, all featuring the Spanish-Mission style architecture unique to main campus and each with its own individual interior style and atmosphere.

Building	Construction Date	Description	Image
Brown Hall	1964	A co-ed residence hall that houses 200 freshmen, Brown is named in honor of Joseph M. Brown, the governor of Georgia when the college first opened in 1913.	
Centennial Hall	2005	Two buildings, three stories each, Centennial is a coed, apartment style community that houses 525 upper-class students.	
Converse Hall	1913 and 1981 and 2011	Converse Hall, named in honor of W. L. Converse, is perhaps the most important structure in the History of Valdosta State University since it was the building in which the foundation of this institution was laid. Converse Hall, built in 1913, housed everything for the college until West Hall was built in 1918. It was the dormitory, infirmary, classrooms, administration offices, dining hall, chapel, and social center. A fire broke out on April 14, 1978, causing immeasurable damage to the structure. Its replacement was completed in 1981. Converse was formerly divided into two separate sections connected by a breezeway. The southern building is a three-story structure while the northern building was a two-story structure. The northern building was replaced in 2011 by the Psychology Building, which is sometimes still referred to as Converse Hall.	
Georgia Hall	1969 and 2009	Georgia is a new 489 bed suite-style hall for freshmen and replaces the former Georgia Hall which housed 200 students in a traditional, double-loaded corridor facility. Georgia houses all freshmen. Originally opened in 1969, Georgia Hall was named for the State of Georgia and for the avenue on which the building is located.	
Hopper Hall	1966 and 2008	Hopper is a 513 bed suite-style residence hall for upperclassmen and is the largest traditional residence hall building on the main campus. Hopper has a center-front position on main campus and contains a residential dining facility, the campus mail center, the Dean of Students and Student Life Offices, VSU's radio station (WVVS), and VSU's newspaper (The Spectator). The original facility was dedicated in November 1966 and housed 200 women. It was named in honor of Annie Powe Hopper, who served as dean of women from 1923-1943.	
Langdale Hall	1969	Langdale is a abandoned 5-story residence and is named after one of the South Georgia's pioneer developers and leading citizens, John W. Langdale. Langdale formerly housed 478 freshmen and was also home to the Langdale Market, the Student Success Center, and student employment. The building is scheduled to be demolished in the summer or fall of 2025, noting asbestos and maintenance concerns.	
Lowndes Hall	1966	A co-ed residence hall that houses 200 freshmen and is named in appreciation for the county in which Valdosta State University is located and for the late William Jones Lowndes, nationally recognized educator and states man.	
Patterson Hall	1969	A co-ed facility that houses approximately 300 first-year students. The women live in the north wing of the building, and the men live in the south wing of the building. Patterson is named conveniently after the street it is located on.	
Reade Hall	1936	A two-story, co-ed residence hall which houses 88 mostly freshmen honor students. Originally constructed in 1936, Reade Hall was formerly known as "Senior Hall." In 1957, it was renamed Reade Hall in honor of Frank R. Reade, the third President of Valdosta State University.	

=== Satellite Facilities ===
Other units of the University are located in satellite facilities adjacent to the campus and along Patterson Street and provide homes for many other offices and programs for VSU. The campuses and principal satellite buildings are connected by the University bus service, operating regularly throughout each class day.

- The Admissions Office
- The Honors House
- The Center for International Programs
- The Women’s Studies Center in Carswell Hall,
- The Regional Center for Continuing Education
- The Psychology Classroom Building
- The Regional Center for Continuing Education
- The Office of Equal Opportunity and Multicultural Affairs
- The Bursary

== The Rea and Lillian Steele North Campus ==
Building	Construction Date	Description	Image
Barrow Hall	1951	Named for David C. Barrow, Chancellor of the University System when South Georgia Normal College opened in 1913. Originally a male dormitory for Emory Junior College, Barrow Hall was remodeled in 1971 to house the Division of Aerospace Studies (Air Force ROTC).	
Pound Hall	1926	Named for Dr. Jere M. Pound, the second president of the University, Pound Hall was originally the main building for Emory Junior College, a private all male school that operated from 1928 to 1953. The property was purchased by Valdosta State when the school closed. It was remodeled in 1974 to house the School of Business Administration. The building was completely renovated in 1992.	
Thaxton Hall	1927	Named for Dr. J. Ralph Thaxton, VSU’s fourth president. Thaxton Hall was the second building constructed for the former Emory Junior College and was originally a dormitory. It now provides facilities for the College of Business Administration.	
