= History of Valdosta State University =

Valdosta State University was established in 1906 in Valdosta, Georgia. South Georgia State Normal College began as a two-year teaching college in 1913 and was an all-female school until 1950 when the name was changed to Valdosta State College. VSC experienced rapid growth in the 1960s and 70s in student population and in construction on campus. In 1993 Valdosta State achieved university status and became the second regional university in the state of Georgia. Since its founding VSU has grown into a co-educational regional university with over 12,000 students.

== Foundation and development ==
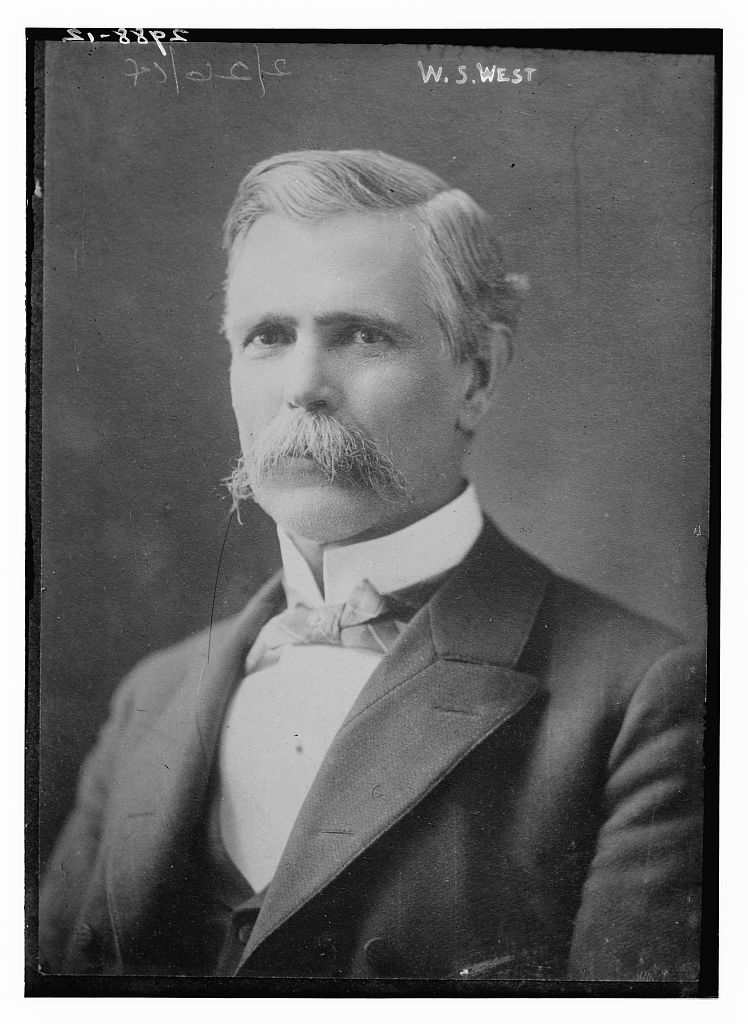
Senator William Stanley West, one of the founders of the college in Valdosta

The idea of establishing a state college in the Valdosta area originated with local citizens. In 1906 State Representative C.R. Ashley and State Senator William Stanley West presented bills proposing the establishment of a college in Valdosta to the Georgia House of Representatives and the Senate, respectively. By an act of the Georgia State Legislature that year the establishment of an agricultural, industrial, or normal college in South Georgia, as a branch of the University of Georgia (UGA), was approved. Similar to the Georgia Normal and Industrial College for Girls established in Milledgeville in 1889, now Georgia College & State University, the Valdosta branch school was intended to serve females who were not permitted admission to UGA.

=== Location ===
Despite the legislation, no funding was granted until the summer of 1911 when the State appropriated $30,000 for construction. In October of that year, the Trustees of the college met with UGA Chancellor David C. Barrow Jr. and began the physical planning of the school. According to the terms of the 1906 legislation, the city of Valdosta agreed to furnish the land for the college. George Varn offered two tracts on the east side of Ashley Street, T.M. Ray offered forty-five acres along the Dixie Highway at the western edge of town, Col. West Offered 50 acres (200,000 m^{2}) between Patterson and Oak Streets, and J. A. dasher offered 50 acres (200,000 m^{2}) on the Burrows place adjacent to the Atlantic Coast Line railroad. The West site's combination of acreage and proximity to downtown was determined the most suitable for campus development.

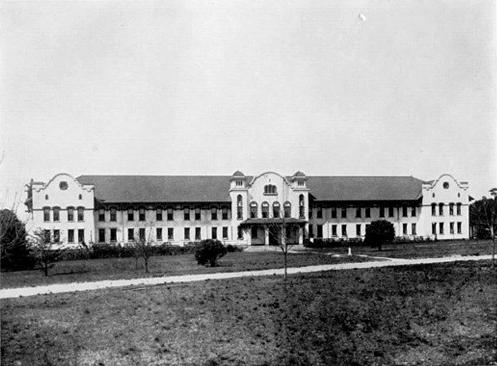
Converse Hall, built in 1913, was the first and only building of the college until 1918

=== Construction ===
After securing the finances and the land the trustees hired Richard Holmes Powell as the school president. Powell's background included work as a principal, college English professor, department head, and State Superintendent of Rural Schools in Georgia. A building Committee was established to contract for design of the school buildings. The architect chosen for the initial building was William Augustus Edwards of the firm Edwards and Sayward. Edwards was one of the primary architects of educational buildings in the Southeastern United States in the early 20th century. During their work in Valdosta, the firm was also designing academic buildings for the University of Florida, Gainesville, the Florida State College for Women and Florida A& M College in Tallahassee, and the Florida School for the Deaf and Blind in St. Augustine, Florida.

The first building on the campus, constructed between 1912 and 1913, was named in honor of William Lorraine Converse Sr. who, as a State Representative, helped expedite the establishment of the college in Valdosta. On December 19, 1912, Dr. Powell moved into office his in the new building and the first pieces of furniture were installed in preparation if the school's opening. Converse Hall served a variety of purposes for the new institution. The structure provided classrooms, administration offices, double-occupancy dormitory rooms, a dining hall, an infirmary, and a chapel. The Spanish Colonial Revival architecture of college in Valdosta was based on the popular style of the era, as well as Powell's personal experiences in the American Southwest. The school opened in January 1913, but the surrounding landscape was primarily undeveloped There were no driveways or sidewalks, and the predominant wetlands at the south were only crossable at Patterson Street.

== South Georgia State Normal College ==
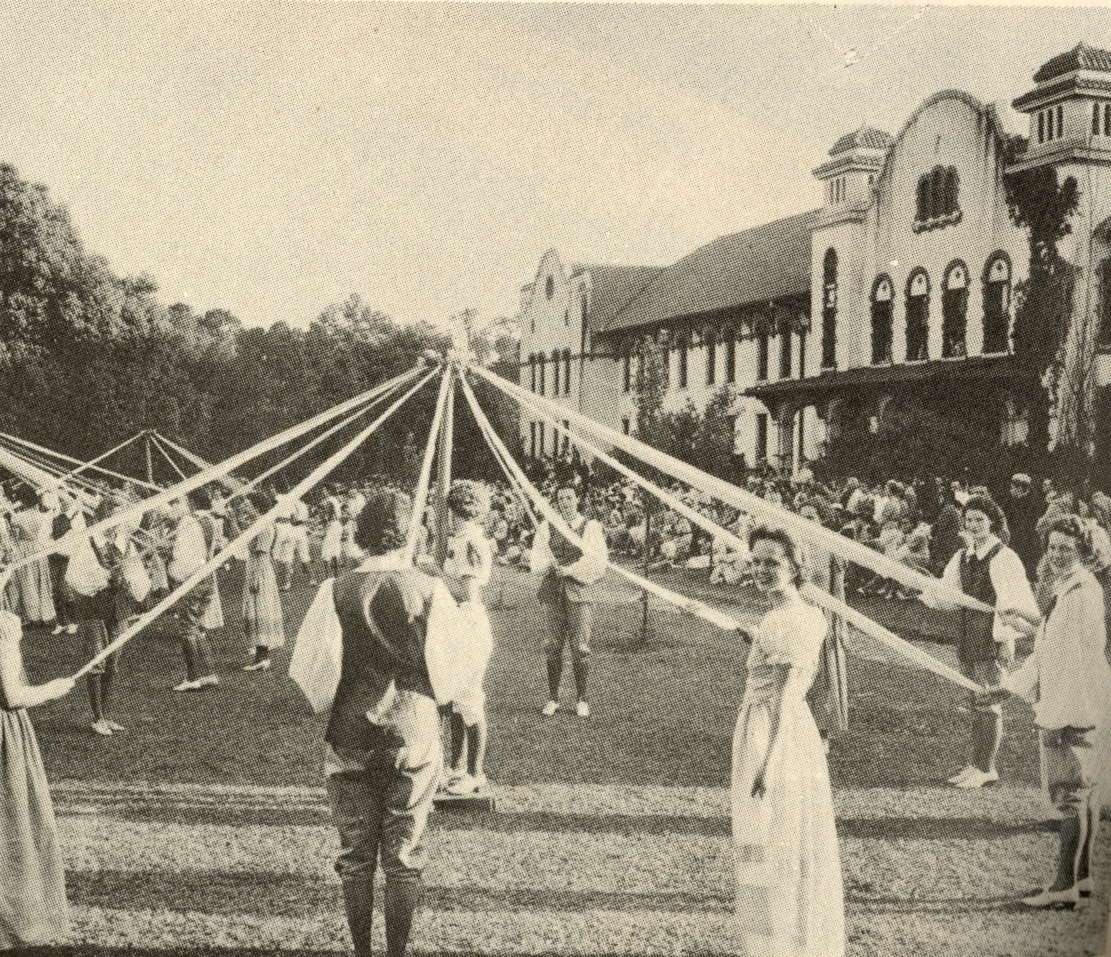
May Day festival in front of Converse Hall

South Georgia State Normal College (SGSNC) opened as a 2-year college with three college freshmen and 15 sub-freshmen. The sub-freshmen were enrolled in a training school, which also provided instruction to Valdosta elementary school-age students. The elementary school classes soon filled to capacity and was the most successful part in the first few years of the college's existence. Early students were required to wear a school uniform, and each paid $10 per year for tuition and $12 per month for food and board. Most came to be teachers and studied subjects from literature to physics to agriculture.

=== May Day festival ===
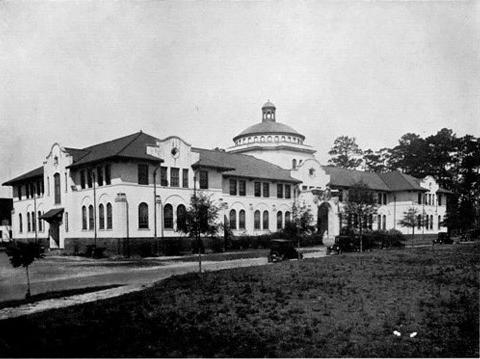
West Hall

One of the most colorful and anticipated events was the annual May Day celebration. The first May Day occurred in the Spring of 1913. Every student took part in the event, and visitors came to the campus to be entertained by the festivities. The first celebrations were held on the front lawn of Converse Hall and were later moved to the outdoor theater at Drexel Park. The events of May Day were often based on the Old English May Day ceremonies that celebrated Spring, but it was common for each year to have a theme. The event had a carnival-like atmosphere with student dressed in elaborate costumes performing skits and dances and the winding of the brightly colored May pole. Each festival had a May Queen, selected from the senior class to preside over the events, and a May Court.

=== West and Ashley Halls ===
In 1916 the legislature made an appropriation of $50,000 to build an Administration building designed by Edwards and Sayward, to which the city of Valdosta donated an additional $25,000. Upon the building's completion in 1917 it was named West Hall to honor Senator W.S. West, who died in 1914.

In the summer of 1919, the college received another appropriation for $75,000 for construction of a new dormitory also designed by Edwards and Sayward, for which the city and Mr. A.J. Strickland contributed an additional $50,000. The building was completed in 1922.

== Georgia State Woman's College ==
In 1922, the school transitioned from a junior college to a four-year college. At the same time, the legislature changed the school's name to Georgia State Woman's College (GSWC) at Valdosta. By that year, the school had grown to 402 undergraduates and the training school to 108 students. The 1920s saw a loosening of the uniform restrictions, until finally only freshmen and sophomores were required to wear them. The upper class students could choose their fashions, but were still monitored for their behavior and proper etiquette. As the decade progressed, GSWC's academic program was expanded and extracurricular activities were broadened. Of the earlier SGSNC traditions, the May Day festival became an annual event, featuring elaborate skits, dances, and sports exhibitions. The schools May Queen and her court paraded in procession across the school grounds before a large campus and community audience and concluded with dancing around the Maypole. Another Victorian tradition honored at the school was the Old English Christmas Feast, which also included period costumes and role playing events.

In 1923 a brick gymnasium was constructed to the west of Building One, and a nearby pre-existing wood structure was converted by students for use as a clubhouse. The “House in the Woods” became a domestic refuge for the female students. At the celebration of the schools tenth anniversary in 1923 Building One was named Converse Hall, in honor of W.L. Converse, and the dormitory was named Ashley Hall for C.R. Ashley, the Treasurer of the board of trustees.

=== Great Depression era ===
The establishment of a statewide Board of Regents in 1931 and the Great Depression brought major changes to GSWC. In 1933, the Board of Regents system-wide reorganization focused the college's mission on the liberal arts and downsized the department of education, and the training school was closed. Also, President Powell, head of the college for 22 years, was made dean of the Coordinate College in Athens, Georgia. Dr. Jere M Pound, president of the Georgia Teachers College, was sent to Valdosta. However, Pound's tenure at GSWC lasted less than a year before illness removed him from his post. Dr. Frank Robertson Reade assumed the job of acting president in 1934, and on Dr. Pound's death in 1935 became president. In addition to strengthening the school's liberal arts departments, Dr. Reade's administration paralleled a period of federally funded campus growth. During his tenure, New Deal programs enabled the school to expand physically from three to seven buildings and provided many improvements to the grounds. The New Deal had also provided for paving of the campus roads and the campus grounds were significantly improved. In 1931, two gray stone fireplaces were constructed by faculty members at the northern and southern edges of the campus. The southern portion of the campus was used for playing fields and the western portion was developed as a golf course. In 1935 the school purchased a two-story wood-frame house on Oak Street for use as a music studio. In 1936, a dormitory, known as Senior Hall, was constructed with state and WPA funds. The building provided housing for 28 student rooms and an auditorium located on the entire south half of the second floor. Also in 1936, construction began on a collegiate-sized pool with underwater lighting and an adjacent bath house. In 1939, the WPA funded construction of the Student Activities Log Cabin, which included offices for campus publications and the Young Women's Christian Association. This building replaced the former "House in Woods" and included a vaulted hall and two fireplaces.

At the beginning of the 1940s, construction began on a new school library and represented the fifth project designed for the campus by the firm of Edwards and Sawyard. Later, the completed building was dedicated by First Lady Eleanor Roosevelt in 1941, owing to a personal friendship between the Roosevelt's and President Reade's family. Upon former President Powell's death, the library was named in his honor in June 1947.

=== World War II years ===
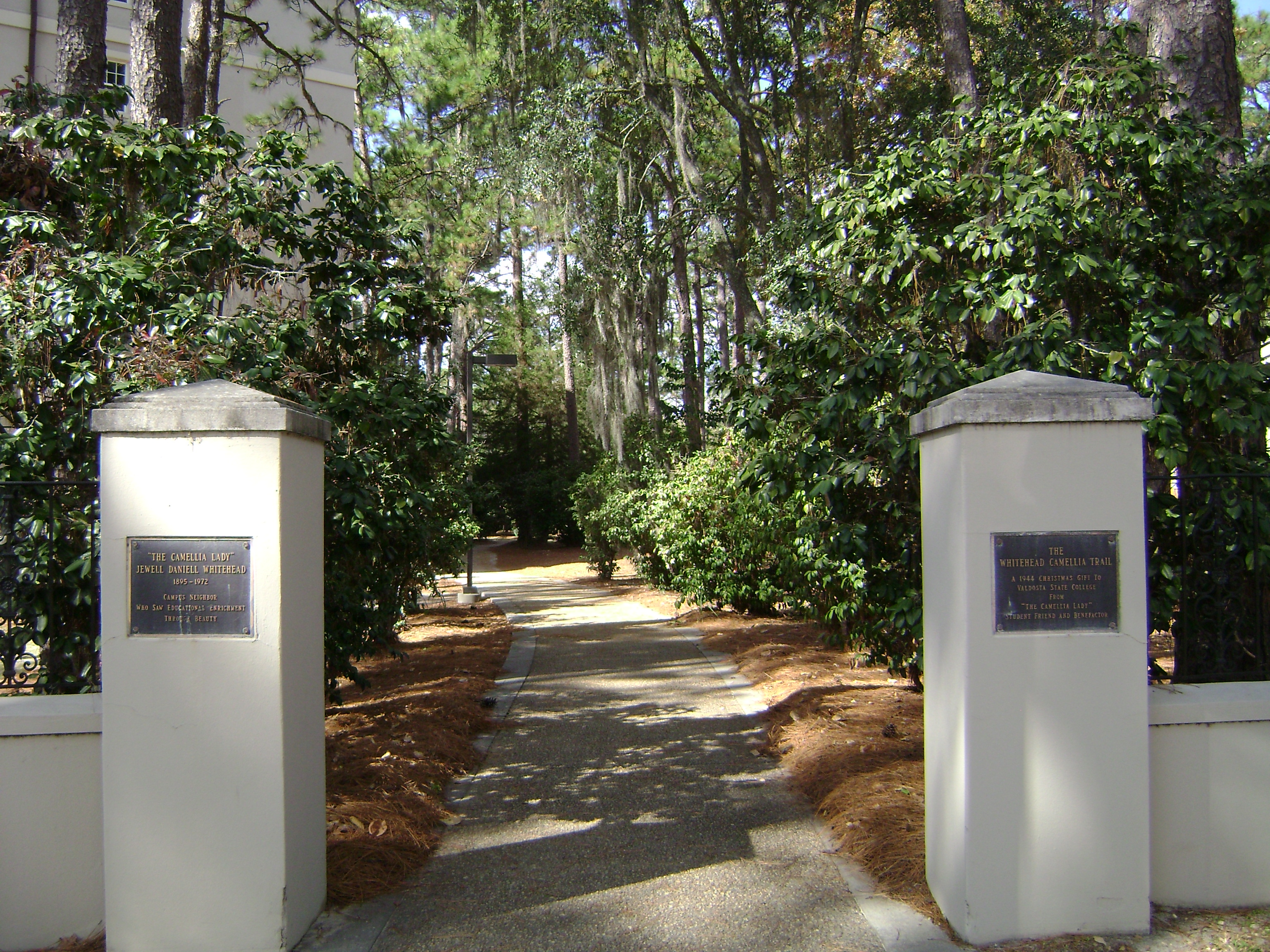
Whitehead Camelia Trail entrance

Further planning for development was halted upon America's entrance into World War II. During the war, GSWC strengthened its nursing program, while emphasizing politics and science in the curriculum. In 1943, the B.S. degree was added. Meanwhile, the Emory Junior College several blocks north of the college closed temporarily, and a few young men from Valdosta attended GSWC. Extracurricular activities were redirected to aid the war effort such as scrap metal drives, USO dances, a War Bond scholarship campaign, and Red Cross activities. Beginning in 1942, Moody Airfield's presence nine miles (14 km) from campus, provided the male participants for many patriotic parties, dances and dates, and the girls supported morale with USA parties held up until 1944. Notably in 1945 a beautification project was initiated by a neighbor of the school. At the wooded northwest portion of the campus along Georgia Avenue, a landscape known as the "Camellia Trail" was donated by Mr. and Mrs. Roy Whitehead. The forested garden included 200 plants representing 96 varieties of camellias.

After the war, tradition re-asserted itself on the GSWC campus. Traditional events such as the Christmas Fest and May Day were re-instituted Meanwhile, Emory Junior College was reopened in 1946. In the vicinity of the Camellia Trail on Georgia Avenue, the school acquired a stately southern colonial residence in 1948 for use as a new Music Studio. In 1948 illness forced President Reade to take a year's leave of absence, and brought Dr. J. Ralph Thaxton from the University of Georgia, where he had served as professor, dean, director of admissions, and registrar, to serve as acting president. Upon Reade's retirement due to poor health in 1949, Thaxton became president. Adjustments to the postwar needs of the state's educational system prompted many changes within the University System of Georgia. In January 1950, the Board of Regents, acting on the advice of a committee which had examined the whole University of Georgia System, voted to change GSWC to a co-ed institution and rename it Valdosta State College.

== Valdosta State College ==
The transition from GSWC to Valdosta State College (VSC) initiated a variety of changes. The focus of the school broadened. Programs in pre-medical, pre-dentistry, and pre-pharmacy were added, and the sciences became more prominent. Business became a popular major after 1950, and the education department began expanding its secondary offerings. However, the college's tradition of bringing in students from South Georgia, an area historically underserved educationally, continued.

In 1953, following the closure of Emory Junior College due to declining admissions, VSC acquired the property for development as a North Campus. Also at this time, the Music Studio on Georgia Avenue was rehabilitated for use as the formal President's Home.

The presence of male students did have an effect on many of the school's prior social traditions. The elaborate costumed festivals came to an end early in the 1950s and were replaced with co-ed events. Christmas Fest ended and Homecoming replaced May Day as a "spring event." Pageants and contests, such as Miss VSC and Homecoming Queen, also became important new events. Within a few years, many of the extracurricular activities were male-led, and by 1956 male students outnumbered the women on campus. Greek organizations were formed, first fraternities and then sororities. Inter-collegiate athletics became a part of campus life when the Rebels all-male basketball and baseball teams were formed.

In 1954, the new Gymnasium and Physical Education building opened followed in 1955 by a new dining hall (named Palms Dining Center in 1981). Both structures were implemented according to the school's 1941 development plan. Both the gymnasium and the dining hall were designed by the schools long time design partner, the Edwards and Sayward firm's successor, Logan & Williams.

To accommodate the separate campuses, a bussing system was established in 1956 between Main and North Campus. The Main Campus boundary was enhanced in 1960 with the construction of a wrought iron arch, bearing the name of the college, opposite West Hall along North Patterson Street. The project, the idea for which began in the 1930s, was funded by the Alumni Association. In the same year, a modern addition was constructed at the rear of West Hall. In 1962, the Farber Health Center was constructed to serve as an infirmary for the growing student population.

In 1963, the college celebrated its 50th anniversary. In the same year, the Valdosta State University Foundation was established "to assist the University in achieving academic excellence" by attracting distinguished alumni and friends to lead the effort to raise private support and providing responsible stewardship for these gifts and other Foundation assets.

=== Construction boom ===
Dr. Thaxton retired for health reasons in 1966, and Dr. S. Walter Martin, former president of Emory University and Vice Chancellor of the University System of Georgia, assumed the presidency. Dr. Sidney Walter Martin presided over a time of physical growth and social change for the college. Although some of the construction projects had begun under Dr. Thaxton's administration, Dr. Martin's tenure coincided with the biggest building boom in the college's history. As well, new programs were begun in Nursing and the Air Force ROTC.

In 1966, construction was completed on the Science Administration Building (later named Nevins Hall) which included a 60-occupancy planetarium. Construction was also in progress on Brown and Lowndes Residence Halls, each occupying 200 students, and Hopper Hall, named for former Dean of Women at VSC, Annie Powe Hopper. All three residence halls were formally arranged to create small intimate quadrangles at their new sites on campus.

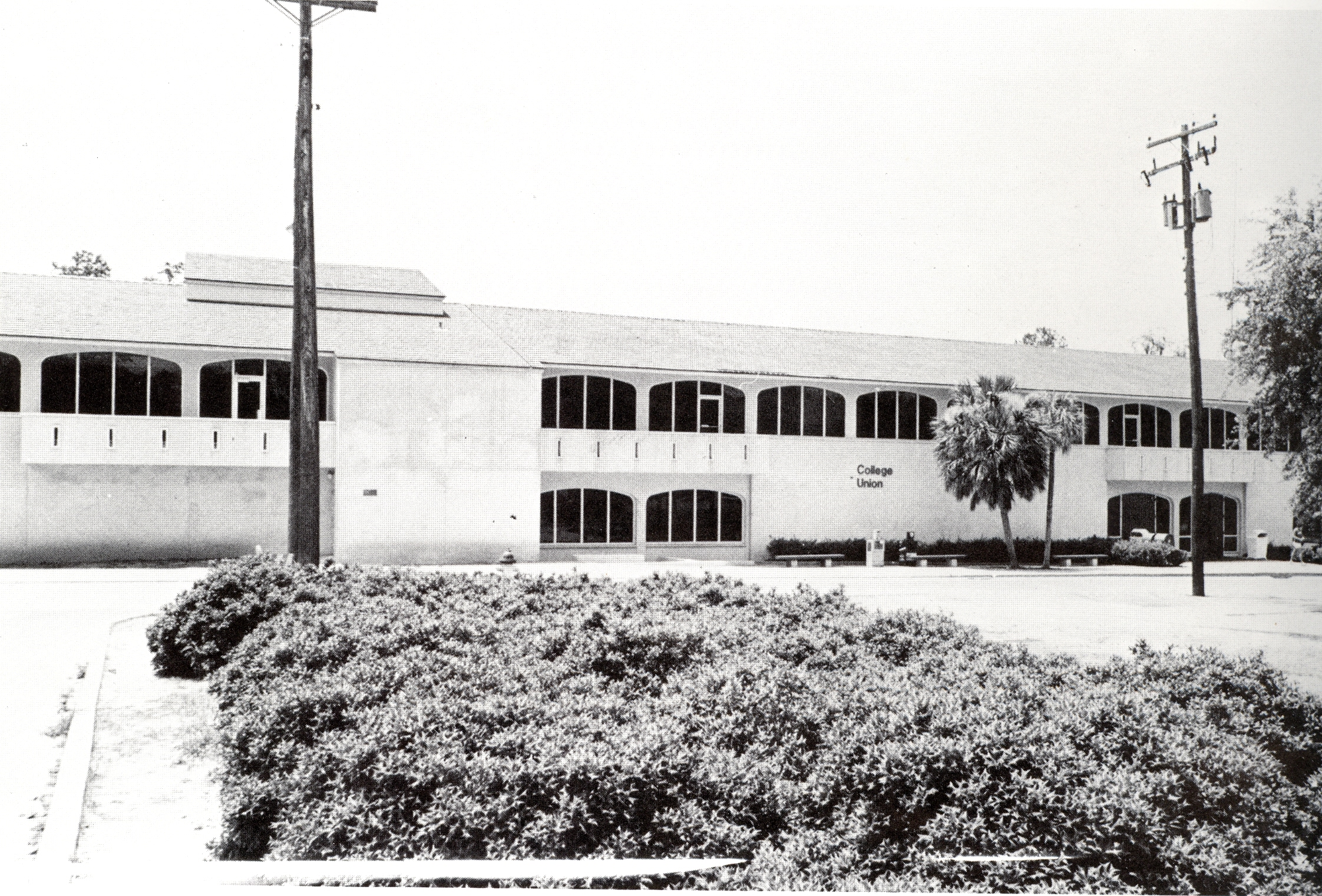
The Student Union

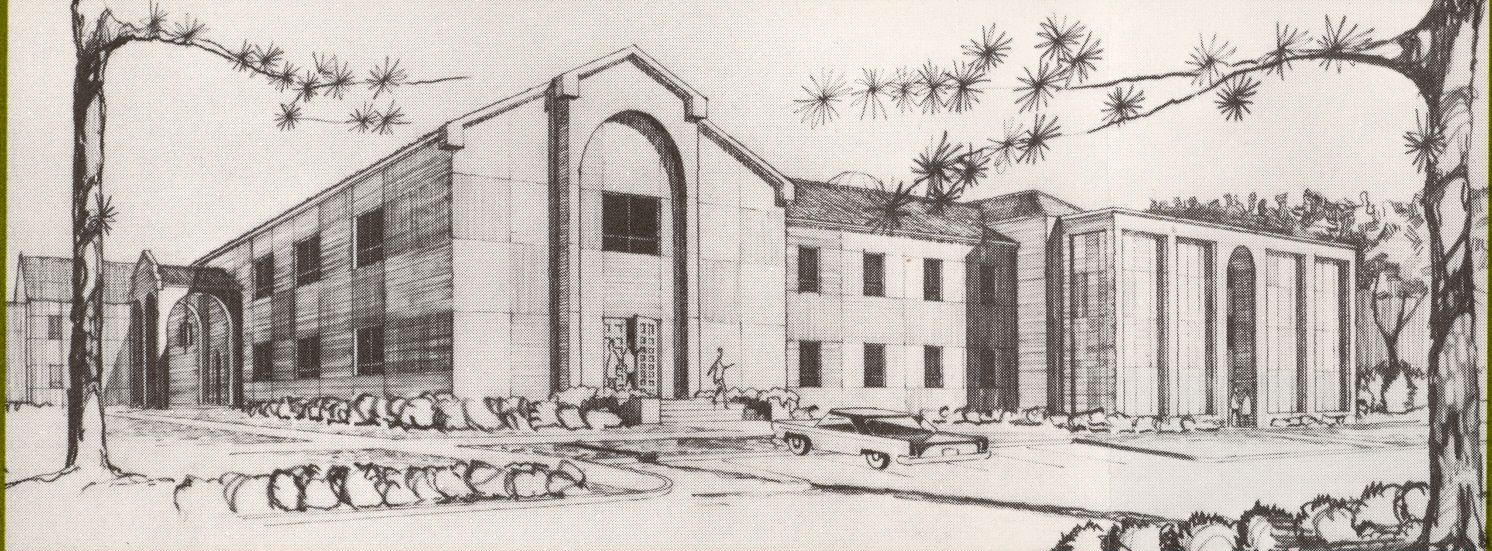
Design for the Nevins Hall Expansion

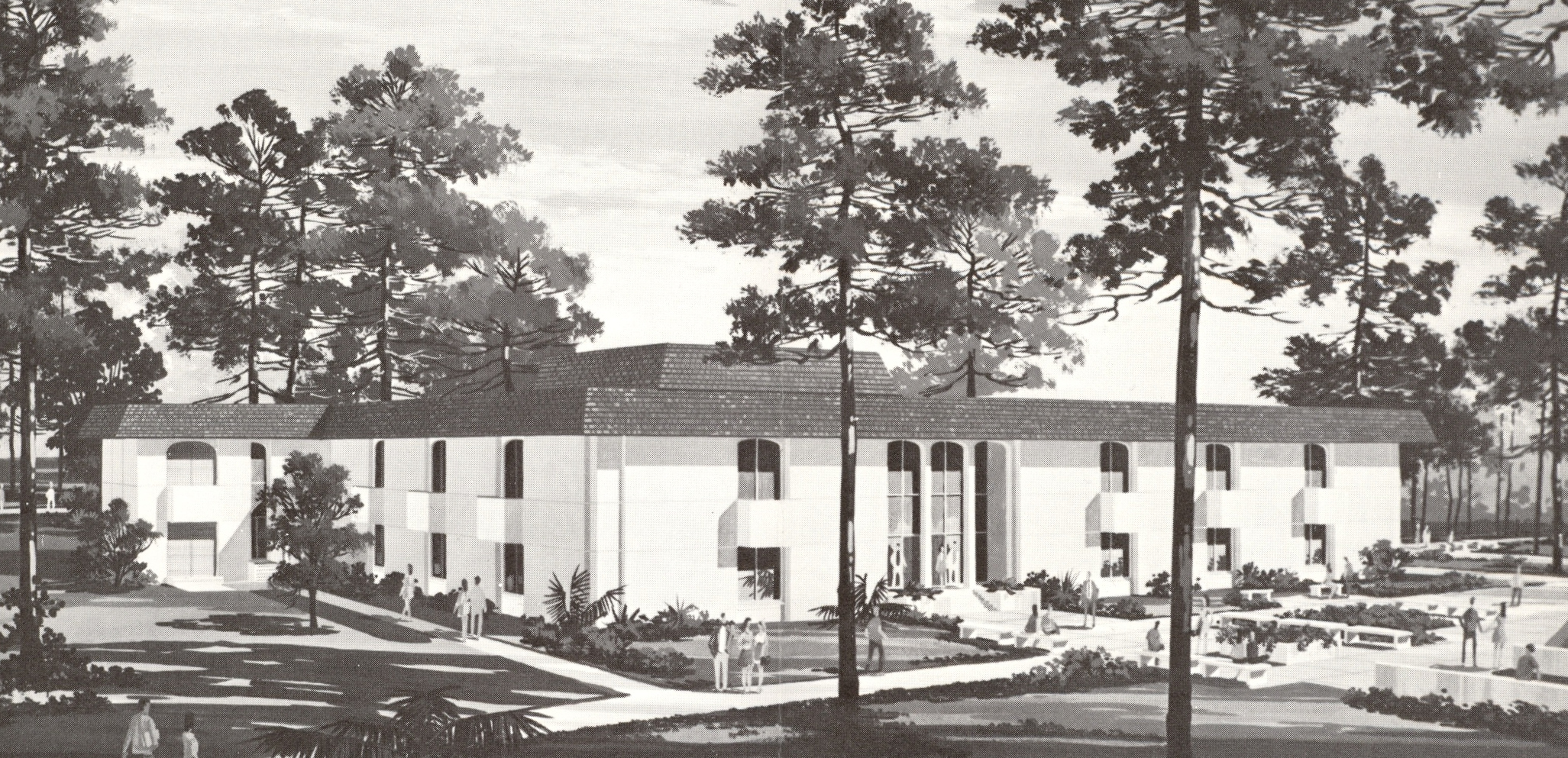
Design for the Education Building

In 1967, construction began on the Student Union. The building replaced the former Student Center converted-gymnasium and enclosed one corner of the swimming pool. The Union contained the university snack bar, book store, radio station WVVS, mail services, the offices of the University Union Board, Student Government Association, the yearbook, and newspaper editorial offices.

At around this same time, planning for a new school library at the southern edge of campus provokes the elimination of vehicular traffic from the main campus, beginning first with the closure of the east west street connecting Patterson to Oak Street. Since the 1930s, and following increased use of automobiles, the original axial pedestrian paths that ran through the center of campus had evolved into paved vehicular roads.

In 1968, construction began on Langdale Hall at the northern edge of campus and necessitated the demolition of the "House in the Woods". The 5-story dormitory became the tallest building on campus. In the following year, construction began on the adjacent Georgia Hall, a 3-story dormitory housing 200 students. Additional signals of the increase in admissions included the addition of two wings to the Dining Hall and the diversion of One Mile Branch Creek for the construction of a surface parking lot near Sunset Hill Cemetery.

The density of the campus core continued to increase with the substantial west addition to Nevins Hall in 1970 which effectively doubled the building size, making it the primary classroom facility for the college.

In 1970, the new Fine Arts Building was dedicated to house the Departments of Art, Music, Speech, and Drama. The 83,000-square-foot (7,700 m^{2}) building was funded through President Johnson's Higher Education Facilities Program and included studios, offices, gallery, lab theater, 244-seat theater, 200-seat auditorium, and media studios.

In 1972, the new Library was dedicated on the site of the former tennis courts between the College Union and Brown Hall. Conceived as a new learning center for the campus, the 3-story, 100,000-square-foot (9,300 m^{2}) building was a notable departure from the school's original Spanish Mission, and later Gothic-inspired architectural styles. The building was designed in a style referred to as the New Formalism, developed in the mid-1950s as practitioners of modernism sought new modes of expression not so tightly bound by the rigid formula of the American version of the International Style. Unique to the design were the integration of the building entrance with the landscape and the use of a wide ceremonial stair which extended from the axis of Blazer Boulevard.

In 1973 the 71,000-square-foot (6,600 m^{2}) Regional Education Center, was completed to house the School of Education, Division of Public Services, Learning Skills Laboratory, and College Counseling located across from the main campus at the intersection of Baytree and Oak Street, the building design was also conceived in the New Formalist style.

=== Integration ===
Valdosta State College was integrated in September 1963. Of the three hundred freshmen that entered VSC that fall two of those freshmen were black. Robert Pierce and Drewnell Thomas were the first African Americans to attend Valdosta State. Pierce and Thomas were honor graduates of Valdosta's Pinevale High School for black students. The two students applied with about twenty other black students. Integration came about peacefully at VSC and both students stayed for the full four years and went on to excel in graduate work and careers. Despite the challenges of those first years of integration from 1963 to 1967, over the next decade the college continued to add African American students, faculty, and administrators.

=== Student activities ===
In 1965, a Georgian-styled residence across from the Main Campus on North Patterson was acquired for use as the Pan-Hellenic House for sororities. Ill health prompted Dr. Thaxton's retirement, and Dr. S. Walter Martin, past president of Emory University and vice chancellor of the university system, became the new president of Valdosta State in 1966.

In the midst of the growing popularity of Greek activities and pageants, the signs of social change common among college campuses during the 1960s and 70s appeared at VSC. Students, both in support and against the Vietnam War, protested and held demonstrations on campus. Also during these years, the continued desegregation of the student body lead to the success and visibility of black scholars, athletes, homecoming queens, and artists. Drug use appeared on campus and "streaking" caused a brief sensation. Of more lasting importance was the inauguration of women's intercollegiate sports- the Lady Blazers in 1973.

=== North Campus redevelopment ===
At the North Campus, the former buildings of the all-male Emory College began to be developed for specialized departments.

Barrow Hall, named for David C. Barrow, Chancellor of the University System when South Georgia Normal College opened in 1913, was converted from a male dormitory in 1971 to house the Air Force ROTC program. In the following year, Thaxton Hall, named for Dr. J. Ralph Thaxton, the 4th President of the college, was converted from a male dormitory for the Nursing Department, and in 1974 Pound Hall, named for former president Jere Madison Pound, was renovated to house the School of Business Administration.

=== Converse Hall fire ===
In the spring of 1978, with Dr. Martin's retirement looming in the summer and the college in the midst of a search for a new president, Converse Hall, VSC's most historic building, burned and had to be demolished. Dr. Hugh Coleman Bailey assumed the post of presidency and arrived in the summer in the wake of the recent catastrophe. Within three years, however, a new Converse Hall opened on the site of the former building. The contemporary structure included 91 furnished apartments and expanded the original building's footprint with a four-story wing at the south. Additionally, some original brick and cast stone was recycled from the original Converse Hall.

=== Athletics ===
In 1982, the roughly 105,000-square-foot (9,800 m^{2}) Physical Education Complex was completed, adjacent to the main campus at the intersection of Baytree Road and Sustella Avenue. The design of the colossal multi-purpose facility included 6,000 seating capacity for basketball, an indoor track, training spaces, and additional ball courts. During this period, the Blazer sports excelled with the creation of a successful football program in 1982, and a national championship baseball team in 1979.

=== Historic rehabilitation ===
Towards the end of the decade, the institution undertook the rehabilitation of two of the campus's signature buildings, both of which were over sixty years old. From 1986 to 1988, the interior of West Hall was completely gutted and reconfigured. All of the building's windows were replaced, most notably those on the modern west wing addition, which was redesigned in the style of the original building. Work also included the construction of a 2-story addition at the end of the western wing, also in keeping with the original Edwards and Sayward design of the building. During this project, a minor rehabilitation was also performed on Reade Hall.

Following the completion of this Main Campus work, a major rehabilitation of Pound Hall on North Campus began in 1990. Lasting two years, this project also included gutting the interior of the building, replacement of the windows and reconfiguration of the floor plan. In August 1990, the Georgia Board of Regents named the Library in honor of Gertrude Gilmer Odum, a major benefactor and professor emeritus of English.

Between 1974 and 1993, VSU, in cooperation with the VSU Foundation, acquired multiple properties adjacent to the historic Main Campus, including more than a dozen homes in the Brookwood North neighborhood, the historic Seago House and the former Southern Bell Offices on North Patterson.

Under Dr. Bailey's tenure beginning in 1978, the school doubled in size from 4,500 to 9,000 students. Through the 1980s and early 1990s the school upgraded existing courses and added graduate programs. With the creation of satellite locations and the expansion of academic programs, non-traditional students gained greater access to the institution. All of these efforts were part of an endeavor to make VSC a university.

== Valdosta State University ==
On July 1, 1993, after years of work and lobbying, VSC became Valdosta State University (VSU), the second regional university in the University System of Georgia, with a special responsibility for the professional graduate needs of its service area. As a regional university in South Georgia, Valdosta State cooperates with other University System institutions to ensure that the region receives the services it needs. To expand its programmatic outreach, it develops and offers programs by distance learning and at off-campus locations throughout the region. As part of its regional mission, VSU expanded its graduate programs to include doctorate degrees and new master's degrees in fields such as social work and library science.

Also in 1993, the Continuing Education program moved into the former Georgia Power building, constructed in 1965, on North Patterson Street adjacent to downtown, and a rehabilitation project began on Powell Hall.

In the same year, VSU received a Georgia American Institute of Architects award for the institution's "consistency in application of Spanish Mission architecture" to its campus complex. Later in 1995, the style greatly influenced the rehabilitation of the former Brookwood Plaza shopping center as a new University Center. The complex of buildings, which included a grocery store, Sears, and Woolworths, were converted for office, classroom, and special use facilities.

As the Main Campus reached its capacity for development, new construction shifted to the Valdosta city blocks south of Brookwood Drive. In 1997, VSU began construction of the 24,000-square-foot (2,200 m^{2}) Special Education Building at the intersection of Patterson and Williams Streets.

One of the most significant contributions to the definition of the campus's original Beaux-Arts plan was realized in 2001 with the completion of the new Science Building. Not since the completion of Nevins Hall had construction affected the campus's half-moon drive, created in the early 1920s. The biology and chemistry building later named for Dr. Hugh Bailey, holds over 50 laboratories and included a sunlight atrium lined with transparent interior walls.

Following the retirement of Dr. Hugh Coleman Bailey in 2001, The Board of Regents selected Dr. Ronald M. Zaccari as president in 2002. Under Zaccari, VSU updated its infrastructure to accommodate student population growth. During his tenure construction included the Blazer Boulevard pedestrian mall, the Centennial Hall dormitories, the student recreation center, a four-story $14.2 million addition off the south side of Odum library adding 95,000 square feet (8,800 m^{2}) in 2004.

2006 marked the beginning of the VSU's centennial celebration which will span until 2013, marking the date from the schools founding and the schools opening.

=== Hayden Barnes controversy ===
In May 2007, T. Hayden Barnes, a student at Valdosta State University (VSU) was "administratively withdrawn" for criticizing the construction of two new parking garages on campus in a manner that University President Ronald Zaccari, over the objection of other administrators, deemed to be indicative of Barnes posing a clear and present danger to the VSU campus.

In January 2008, T. Hayden Barnes filed a civil rights lawsuit for violation of his First Amendment and due process rights against the university, VSU President Ronald Zaccari, the Board of Regents of the University System of Georgia, and other VSU administrators. The suit was filed in the United States District Court for the Northern District of Georgia by First Amendment attorney Robert Corn-Revere in cooperation with the Foundation for Individual Rights in Education (FIRE).

It was announced in the September 8, 2010 edition of the Valdosta Daily Times that Hayden Barnes won his legal battle against past university president Dr. Ronald Zaccari. The case is presently on appeal before the United States Court of Appeals for the Eleventh Circuit.

The Foundation for Individual Rights in Education (FIRE) added Valdosta State University (VSU) to its "Red Alert" list of institutions that act with severe and ongoing disregard for the fundamental rights of its students or faculty members. VSU was joined by two other schools, Tufts University and Johns Hopkins University, on FIRE's "Red Alert" list. FIRE took VSU off of their "Red Alert" list after new Valdosta State President Patrick Schloss implemented new rules in September 2008 allowing a drastic increase in free speech expression.

=== Recent construction ===
Dr. Patrick J. Schloss became the President of VSU in the Summer of 2008 and was in office during the completion of several buildings that had been under development during the previous administration. The original Hopper Hall was demolished in August 2007 to make way for a larger Hopper, which houses 513 students, the student mail center, offices for student life, and a dining facility. A new 27,000-square-foot (2,500 m^{2}) Student Health Center opened at VSU in early 2009. Upon completion of the new Hopper Hall, the old Georgia Hall was demolished and rebuilt as a six-story facility housing 489 students and reopened in August 2009.

In the fall of 2008, construction began on a new Student Union. The previous Union on the campus was too small to accommodate the growth of the university and was demolished along with the gymnasium that sat adjacent to the site. The new 120,000-square-foot (11,000 m^{2}) student union was completed in January 2010 and features a food court, bookstore, theater, game room, lounge space, and student organization offices.

In the fall of 2010, the north portion of the Converse Hall dormitory was demolished for the construction of a new, three story, 33,000-square-foot (3,100 m^{2}) psychology and counseling building. The new structure offers classrooms, laboratories, clinical space, and administrative offices for the Department of Psychology and Counseling. The ground breaking for the project was held August 24, 2010 and an official ribbon cutting was held on June 23, 2011.

A large Health Science and Business Administration Building consolidated several colleges into one facility. This building is located on the North Campus of Valdosta State University. Its proximity to South Georgia Medical Center, the largest hospital in the region, allows for the expansion of the College of Nursing and other health programs. On April 30, 2012, VSU held a community celebration for the Health Sciences and Business Administration building on the lawn of North Campus that included guests such as Georgia State Sen. Tim Golden, Georgia Lt. Gov. Casey Cagle, Valdosta Mayor John Gayle and Georgia state Reps. Amy Carter, Jason Shaw, and Ellis Black. An official groundbreaking was held on October 4, 2012. The new facility was completed by January 2014.

A ground breaking was held on August 8, 2011, for the construction of a $5.5 million addition onto the southern side of Bailey Science Center. On June 27, 2012, VSU held a ribbon cutting and officially opened the new expansion. The 15,000-square-foot addition includes two 75-seat multipurpose laboratories, two 30-seat classrooms, and 22 faculty offices.

In addition to the numerous building projects, many renovation projects had been undertaken including the total renovation of historic Reade Hall (2009), Nevins Hall (2010), the original portion of Odum Library (2010–2011) and Ashley Hall (2012).

=== Current events ===
In the fall of 2009 VSU's student population reached a new record enrollment of over 12,000, with almost half of its student population from the metro Atlanta area. By the Fall of 2011 the student population was over 13,000.

On April 25, 2011, Patrick Schloss announced that he had accepted a new position with the University System of Georgia as the special assistant to the executive vice chancellor for retention, progression, and graduation. Schloss' tenure finished at the end of June 2011 after three years at VSU. Dr. Louis H. Levy, former vice president for Academic Affairs at VSU, was named interim president effective July 1, 2011 while a Presidential Search and Screen Committee searched a replacement for Schloss. In February 2012 the final four presidency candidates were announced — Dr. Michael R. Lane, Dr. William J. McKinney, Dr. Cheryl Norton and Dr. Raymond W. Alden. On March 30, Dr. William J. McKinney was announced as the finalist for the position and the Board of Regents confirmed McKinney as the next president on April 13. He took office as president of Valdosta State on July 1, 2012.

=== National champions ===
Valdosta State University teams have seen notable athletic success in the 2000s, appearing in 11 national title games, and winning seven, across three sports.

==== Football ====
The VSU football team has appeared in five, and won four, Division II National Championship games since 2002. The Blazers defeated the Bulldogs of Ferris State University in 2018 with a score of 49–47 to win their most recent NCAA Division II National Football Championship. The Blazers won the 2012 championship by beating Winston-Salem State University 35–7. VSU won the 2007 national championship by defeating Northwest Missouri State University 25–20. The Blazers also won the 2004 national championship with a 36–31 win over Pittsburg State University. The Blazers lost to Grand Valley State University 31–24 in the 2002 NCAA Division II national championship.

==== Men's tennis ====
Valdosta State University's men's tennis team won the 2011 NCAA Division II national championship with a 5–2 win over Barry University in Altamonte Springs, Florida. The Blazers also won the 2006 national title after defeating Lynn University 5-2 and finishing the season undefeated. The Blazers also played for the national championship in 2004, 2007, and 2010.

==== Softball ====
The Valdosta State Lady Blazers won the 2012 NCAA Division II softball championship, the first women's national title in school history, beating UC San Diego 4–1. The VSU softball team also set a GSC record with a 36 consecutive game winning streak. In 2010 VSU made its first appearance in the Division II national softball tournament and fell 4–3 in the national championship to Hawaii Pacific.
