= Valdosta (disambiguation) =

Valdosta is a city in southern Georgia, United States. "Valdosta" may also refer to:

- Valdosta metropolitan area
- Valdosta Commercial Historic District
- Valdosta State University
- Valdosta State Blazers the athletic programs of the University.
  - Valdosta State Blazers football, the football team of Valdosta State University.
  - Valdosta State–West Georgia football rivalry
  - Valdosta State University Rugby Club
- Valdosta High School
- Valdosta Regional Airport
- Valdosta City School District
- Valdosta Railway
- Valdosta Tigers
- Valdosta Mall
- Valdosta (EP)
- Valdostan Union, a political party in Italy.
