= Annie Powe Hopper =

American academic

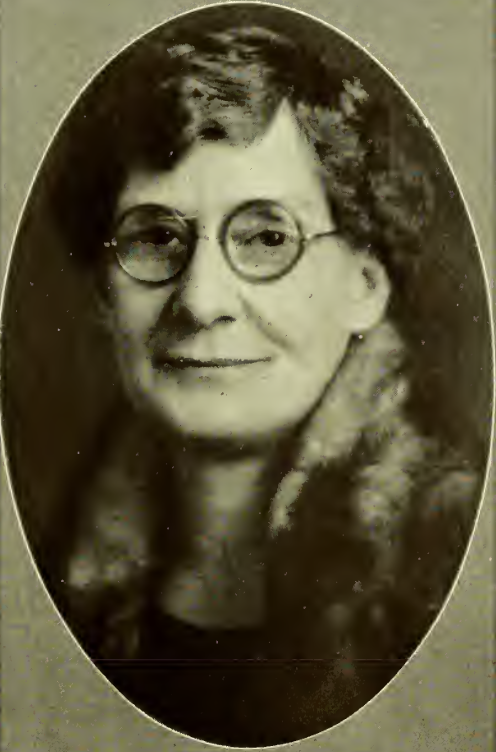
- Annie Powe Hopper, from the 1926 yearbook of the Georgia State Women's College
- Born: July 5, 1875; Wayne County, Mississippi, United States
- Died: April 26, 1952 (age 76)
- Occupation(s): Dean of women, professor, school principal

Annie Powe Hopper (July 5, 1875 – April 26, 1952) was an American college professor. She taught geography and was the first dean of women at the Georgia State Woman's College in the 1920s and 1930s.

== Early life and education ==
Hopper was born in Wayne County, Mississippi, the daughter of John Campbell Hopper and Mary Lavina West Hopper. She had several brothers. She graduated from George Peabody College in Tennessee in 1919, and earned a master's degree at Teachers College, Columbia University.

== Career ==
Hopper was a school principal in Saucier, Mississippi during World War I. She was a professor of geography and the first dean of women at the Georgia State Woman's College, serving in that post from 1922 until she retired in 1943. She was faculty advisor to the YWCA at the college.

Hopper was president of the Deans of Women department of the Georgia Education Association in 1931. She was a member of the Daughters of the American Revolution, and the American Association of University Women.

== Personal life and legacy ==
Hopper, whose appearance was described as "distinguished", retired to Lucedale, Mississippi, and died in 1952, at the age of 76. Since 1962, Valdosta State University has presented the annual Annie Powe Hopper Award to "a senior who represents the university’s high academic standards and exemplifies its traditions of excellence." There is also a dormitory named Hopper Hall on campus, named in her memory.
