= Peach State Summer Theatre =

American summer theatre

Coordinates: 30°50′43.0″N 83°17′20.3″W

- Location: Valdosta, Georgia, US
- Founded: 1990
- Founded by: Valdosta State University Theatre
- Type of play: Musical
- Festival date: 1990–present
- Website: www.valdosta.edu/psst

Peach State Summer Theatre (PSST) is an American summer theatre on the campus of Valdosta State University in Valdosta, Georgia. Each summer, a group of some 60 actor-singers, dancers, technicians, managers, and creators will reside in Valdosta for a nine-week season. During that time, they will rehearse, build and present three musicals in rotating repertory.

In 2006, Peach State Summer Theatre was designated the Official Musical Theatre of the State of Georgia by the Georgia Legislature.

== Jekyll Island Musical Theatre Festival ==
In 1990, Valdosta State University Theatre and the Jekyll Island Authority began offering live, professional musical performances in repertory cycles of three productions each summer. The performances were held on Jekyll Island as a way to offer the large number of tourists a variety of entertainment during their stay and were presented in the Jekyll Island Amphitheatre. VSU auditioned, cast, and hired a mix of professional performers, current Valdosta State Theatre students and faculty, as well as returning theatre graduates and staff to manage the program.

Dedicated to musicals, the first Jekyll Island Musical Theatre Festival season opened with performances of The Roar of the Greasepaint – The Smell of the Crowd, Tintypes, and The Robber Bridegroom.

== Peach State Summer Theatre ==
For 15 years, VSU Theatre reps travelled to Jekyll Island to present three musicals during a 9-week period. By 2005, budget restraints within the state's university system resulted in moving the program from Jekyll to Valdosta and the creation of Peach State Summer Theatre, or PSST.

Peach State has maintained the repertory tradition of the Jekyll Island Musical Theatre Festival by presenting three musicals each summer in VSU's Sawyer Theatre in the Fine Arts Building. Casting notices take two to three years to reach potential employees.

=== 20th anniversary ===
In summer 2010, Peach State Summer Theatre celebrated 20 years of professional musical theatre in South Georgia. The 2010 PSST season featured productions of White Christmas, Mulan, and The Secret Garden. The three shows were performed in a rotating repertoire from June 4 to July 18.
