= Hayden Barnes controversy =

Timeline of the expulsion of T. Barnes over comments over two parking garages

In May 2007, T. Hayden Barnes, a student at Valdosta State University (VSU) was "administratively withdrawn" for criticizing the construction of two new parking garages on campus. University President Ronald Zaccari said Barnes's criticism was "threatening" and, over the objection of other administrators, deemed Barnes a danger to the VSU campus. In 2008 Barnes filed a lawsuit which, after several rulings and appeals, led to $900,000 settlement against the university in July 2015.

== Background ==
Concerned that new garages would provide little incentive for VSU students to rely less on cars, Barnes openly advocated for student fees budgeted for the parking garages to be spent elsewhere such as an expanded campus transportation system. Student protests against parking expenditures had taken place at other campuses, including Cornell University in 2005, but Barnes' campaign did not receive support from the Valdosta student environmental group. Barnes spread his message by sending letters to his student newspaper, posting flyers on campus, and including pictures of the proposed parking garages on his page on Facebook. The Facebook photos were used by Zaccari as a pretext for Barnes’ expulsion, with the President arguing they were "threatening" and that Barnes represent a safety risk.

Facebook Artwork

Reconstruction of the original, blurry, and allegedly "threatening" collage

Captions for the online photos of the proposed parking garages included the words "Ronald Zaccari Memorial Parking Garage". Barnes maintained this meant to suggest that students would remember President Zaccari's tenure by the garages, Zaccari said he believed otherwise.

Over the advice of other administrators, including the chief of the university police department, Zaccari "administratively withdrew" Barnes without a hearing. Barnes received notice that he had been deemed a "clear and present danger to the campus" in a letter slipped underneath his dorm-room door.

== Lawsuit ==
In January 2008, T. Hayden Barnes filed a civil rights lawsuit for violation of his First Amendment and due process rights against the university, VSU President Ronald Zaccari, the Board of Regents of the University System of Georgia, and other VSU administrators. The suit was filed in the United States District Court for the Northern District of Georgia by First Amendment attorney Robert Corn-Revere in cooperation with the Foundation for Individual Rights in Education (FIRE).

It was announced in the September 8, 2010 edition of the Valdosta Daily Times that Hayden Barnes won his legal battle against past university president Dr. Ronald Zaccari. On February 7, 2012, the United States Court of Appeals for the Eleventh Circuit decided that Zaccari may be found personally liable for violating Barnes due process rights. Barnes' suit against the Georgia Board of Regents for breach of contract was denied by the 11th Circuit.

In July 2015, the university's insurers settled the case for $900,000. In a Huffington Post column, FIRE President Greg Lukianoff wrote that administrators like Zaccari should not have the protection of the university and its insurers when they knowingly break the law, as was indicated when the 11th Circuit stripped the former president of his qualified immunity. Lukianoff offered an example of an administrator deliberately running down a student with his car, and stated this is no different. He added until administrators understand they have skin in the game, they will continue to violate student's rights if they believe the university and its insurers will take the brunt of the fall-out.

== FIRE rating and documentary ==
The Foundation for Individual Rights in Education (FIRE) added Valdosta State University (VSU) to its "Red Alert" list of institutions that act with severe and ongoing disregard for the fundamental rights of its students or faculty members. VSU was joined by two other schools, Tufts University and Johns Hopkins University, on FIRE's "Red Alert" list. FIRE took VSU off of their "Red Alert" list after new Valdosta State President Patrick Schloss implemented new rules in September 2008 allowing a drastic increase in free speech expression.

The Barnes controversy was the subject of a short documentary produced by FIRE and garnered attention in the Valdosta Daily Times, Chronicle of Higher Education, Atlanta Journal-Constitution, WALB, WCTV, and The Huffington Post.
