= Valdosta State University Rugby Club =

Valdosta
- Full name: Valdosta State University Rugby Club
- Union: USA Rugby
- Nickname(s): Blazers
- Founded: 2010; 15 years ago
- Region: Georgia
- President: Derick Howard
- Captain(s): Derick Howard
- League(s): NSCRU

The Valdosta State University Rugby Club is the intercollegiate men's rugby union team that represents Valdosta State University in the USA Rugby league. The club has a very active social life on and off campus. The club is also regularly contacted by University of the West of Scotland Rugby Football Club of Scotland whose university is an international partner of VSU.

== Tournaments, Championships and Titles ==
- 1st: Shamrock Tournament
- 1st: 1st Annual Blazin' 7's
- 2nd: GRU 7's
- 2nd: Augusta Back 9 7s
- 3rd: NSCRO 7s National Championship
- 4th: Savannah 7s
