= Hugh C. Bailey Science Center =

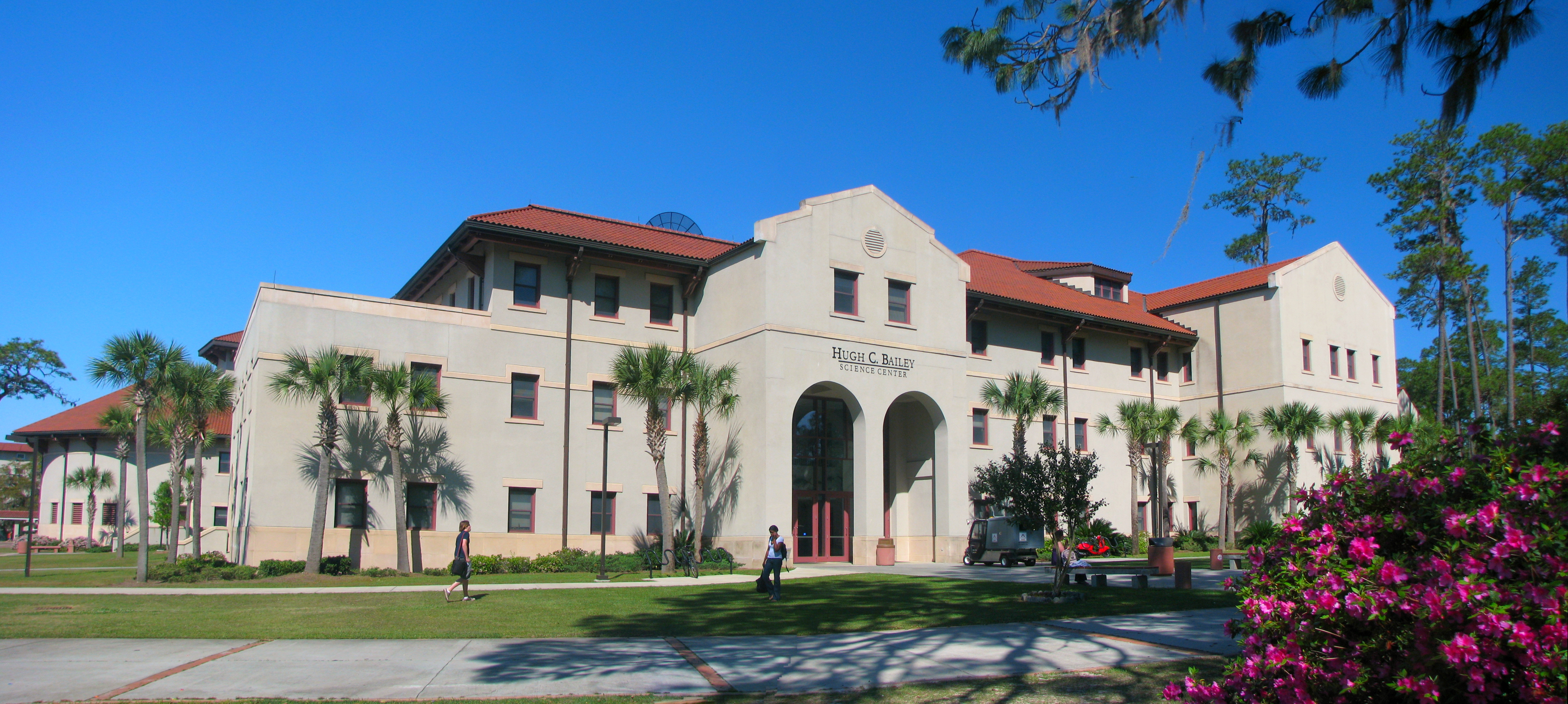
- Former names: Biology and Chemistry Building

General information
- Architectural style: Spanish-mission
- Location: 1500 North Patterson Street; Valdosta, Georgia, USA
- Cost: $23 million
- Owner: Valdosta State University

Technical details
- Floor count: 3
- Floor area: 148,165 square feet

Design and construction
- Architecture firm: Ingram, Parris Group and Lord Aeck Sargent

The Hugh C. Bailey Science Center at Valdosta State University in Valdosta, Georgia, serves as the home of the Biology and Chemistry Departments. The facility is named after former VSU President Hugh C. Bailey who served from 1978 to 2001.

== History ==
Bailey Science Center came about as a means of dealing with overcrowding and the lack of space for future growth facing both the Biology and Chemistry Departments. The new science building was designed to take pressure off of Nevins Hall which had served as the science building at Valdosta State for nearly 30 years. Nevins' remaining occupants, after the new facility was completed and the Biology and Chemistry departments had moved, included the departments of mathematics, computer science, physics, astronomy, and geo-sciences.

=== Construction ===
The formal ground breaking ceremony took place on Sept. 26, 1996. Construction on the approximately 148,000-square-foot (13,700 m^{2}) building did not begin until the summer of 1998. The construction contract was awarded to M.M. Parrish Construction, Inc. of Gainesville, Fla. and the building architecture was designed by Ingram, Parris Group (IPG) of Valdosta. IPG enlisted the assistance of Lord, Aeck and Sargent of Atlanta and Research Facilities Design of San Diego to lend their design expertise in the area of laboratory facilities.

Contracted in 1998, the facility was scheduled to be completed by October 15, 1999, with a budgeted cost of $19,296,000. Delays and cost overruns resulted in a completion date in late 2000, at a final cost of $22.4 million. Faculty of the Biology and Chemistry departments began moving into the new structure in November 2000, with the first classes held in January 2001. The structure was dedicated on April 23, 2001, and renamed in honor of High C. Bailey, former VSU president.

== Expansion ==
A ground breaking was held on August 8, 2011, for the construction of a two-story 15,000-square-foot (1,400 m^{2}) addition onto the southern side of Bailey Science Center. The $5.5 million project, scheduled for completion before the fall of 2012, includes two 75-seat multipurpose laboratories, two 30-seat classrooms, and 20 faculty offices. The architecture firm responsible for the addition is Stanley Beaman & Sears, Inc. of Atlanta. The Savannah office of Elkins Constructors, Inc. is providing construction management.

Valdosta State University held an official opening for the addition to the Bailey Science Center on June 27, 2012. The event was attended by faculty, staff, and students, and featured Interim President Louis H. Levy, Student Government Association President Graham Davis, and incoming VSU President William J. McKinney cutting the ribbon to the new facility.

The student population of VSU grew from 9,000 to over 13,000 in the time since Bailey first opened in 2001. The number of biology majors had more than doubled and between 30 and 40 chemistry majors graduate each year compared to two or three in 2000. The new facilities will accommodate the growth in science students while existing facilities will be used more for faculty and student research.

== Features ==
The Bailey Science Center has 22 teaching and 19 research laboratories that occupy the entire north side of the building. In addition, it has four greenhouses on the rooftop; 11 classrooms, including four 48 seat classrooms, and one 96 seat classroom; a large auditorium which seats 275, and a smaller auditorium which seats 148; two conference rooms and 41 offices.
