= Student Union (Valdosta State University) =

University building in Valdosta, Georgia, US

Coordinates: 30.84697°N 83.28959°W

Valdosta State University Student Union
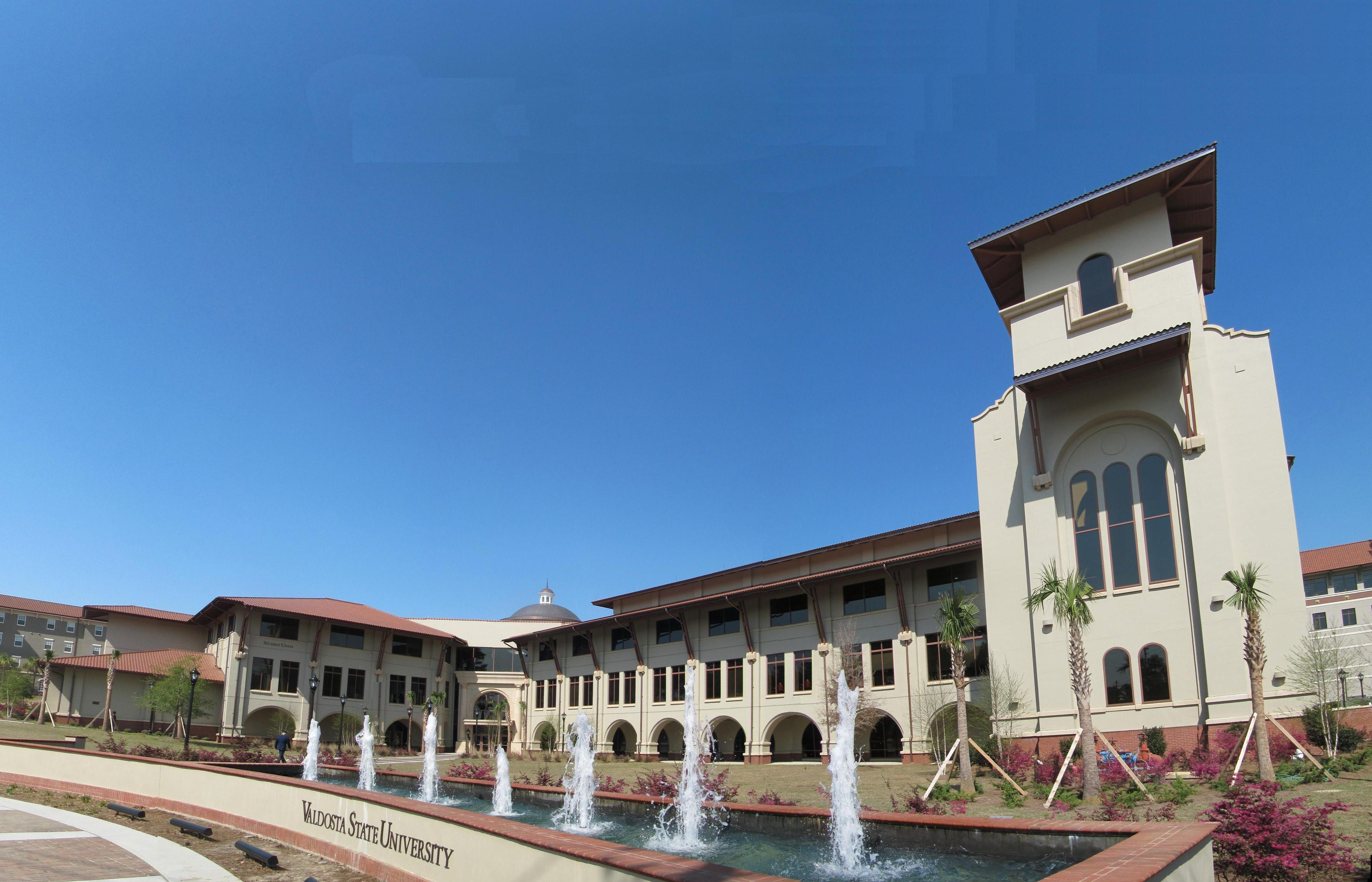
- Type: Student Union
- Established: 2010
- Director: Robin Vickery
- Location: Valdosta, Georgia, USA
- Website: http://www.valdosta.edu/stulife/

The Student Union of Valdosta State University serves as the social center of VSU and offers students a food court, bookstore, theater, game room, lounge space, and student organization offices.

== History ==
The original University Union, built in 1966, contained the University snack bar, book store, radio station WVVS, mail services, a swimming pool, the offices of the University Union Board, Student Government Association, the yearbook, and newspaper editorial offices. The school book store was later relocated to a larger structure between S. Walter Martin Hall and the Special Education and Communication Disorders Building on the southern portion of the campus. A committee of students, faculty, and staff was formed in 2004 to study the possibility of opening a new Student Union. It was determined that the original facility was inadequate to serve Valdosta State University's growing student enrollment.

In 2008, after years of planning, construction began on a new facility to replace the outdated Union to better accommodate the growing student population of VSU. The construction of the facility was paid for through student fees. The old 35,000-square-foot (3,300 m^{2}) Student Union and the old gymnasium were demolished to allow room for the construction of the 113,000-square-foot (10,500 m^{2}), three story building. The facility opened on January 7, 2010 and a ribbon cutting ceremony was held January 19.

== Facility Details ==
- The buildings official size is 113,604 square feet (10,554.2 m^{2})
- The total cost of construction was $43.2 Million
- WTW Architects of Pittsburgh and local firm Ellis, Rickett and Associates Architects and Planners designed the new student union and Skanska USA Building, Inc. served as contractors.

== Features ==
The Student Union features a 305-seat theater with Dolby surround sound, a 10x17' movie screen, and convenience area outside the theater. A two-story, 20,000 square feet (1,900 m^{2}) VSU Bookstore is located inside the Student Union that features a technology shop and text books on the first floor and university merchandise on the second. A game room that offers pool tables, table tennis, board and card games, and video gaming systems is on the bottom floor. On the second floor is a food court that contains a Moe's Southwest Grill, Starbucks, and a Chick-fil-A and features indoor and outside seating. On the third floor is a multi-Purpose Room with seating capacity for 540 persons and lecture seating capacity for 850 persons. The space can also be divided into three smaller rooms to host multiple events. A glass-walled, two-story rotunda serves as a lounge space with computer kiosks for students. The windows give students a view of Hopper Hall, Converse Hall and Odum Library. The Student Union also features space for student organizations with 24 suites that will accommodate student groups, and 6 meeting rooms.

== Photo gallery ==
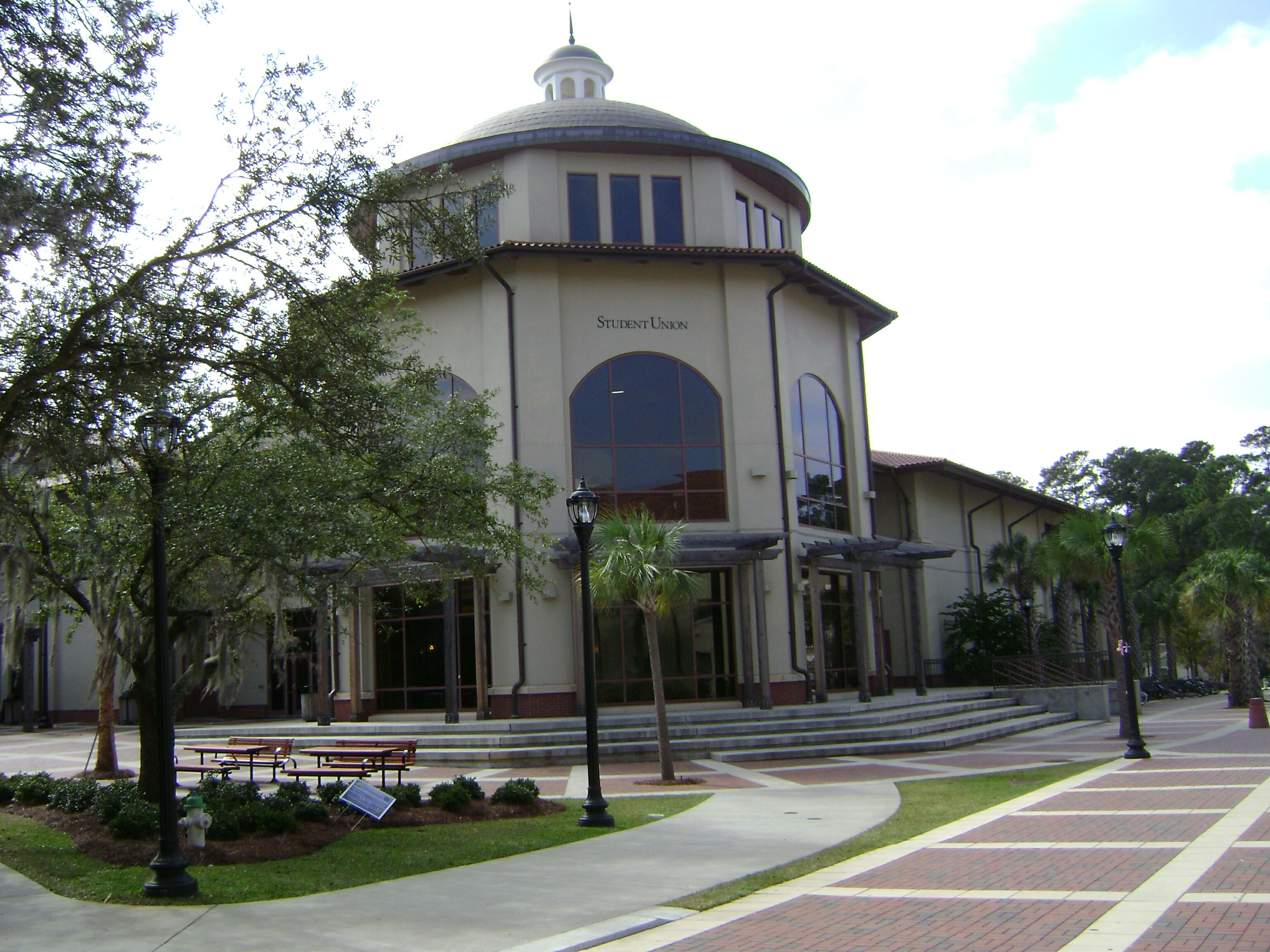
NE corner of Student Union dome

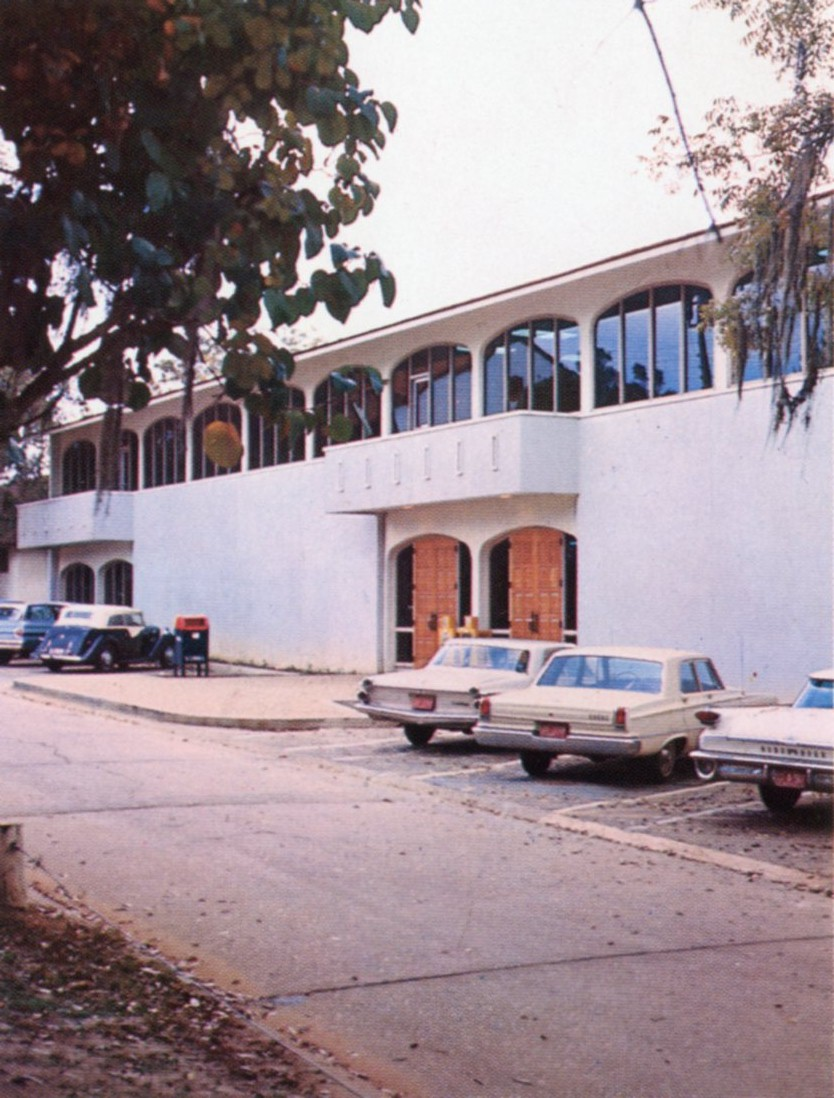
The former College Union newly constructed in 1967

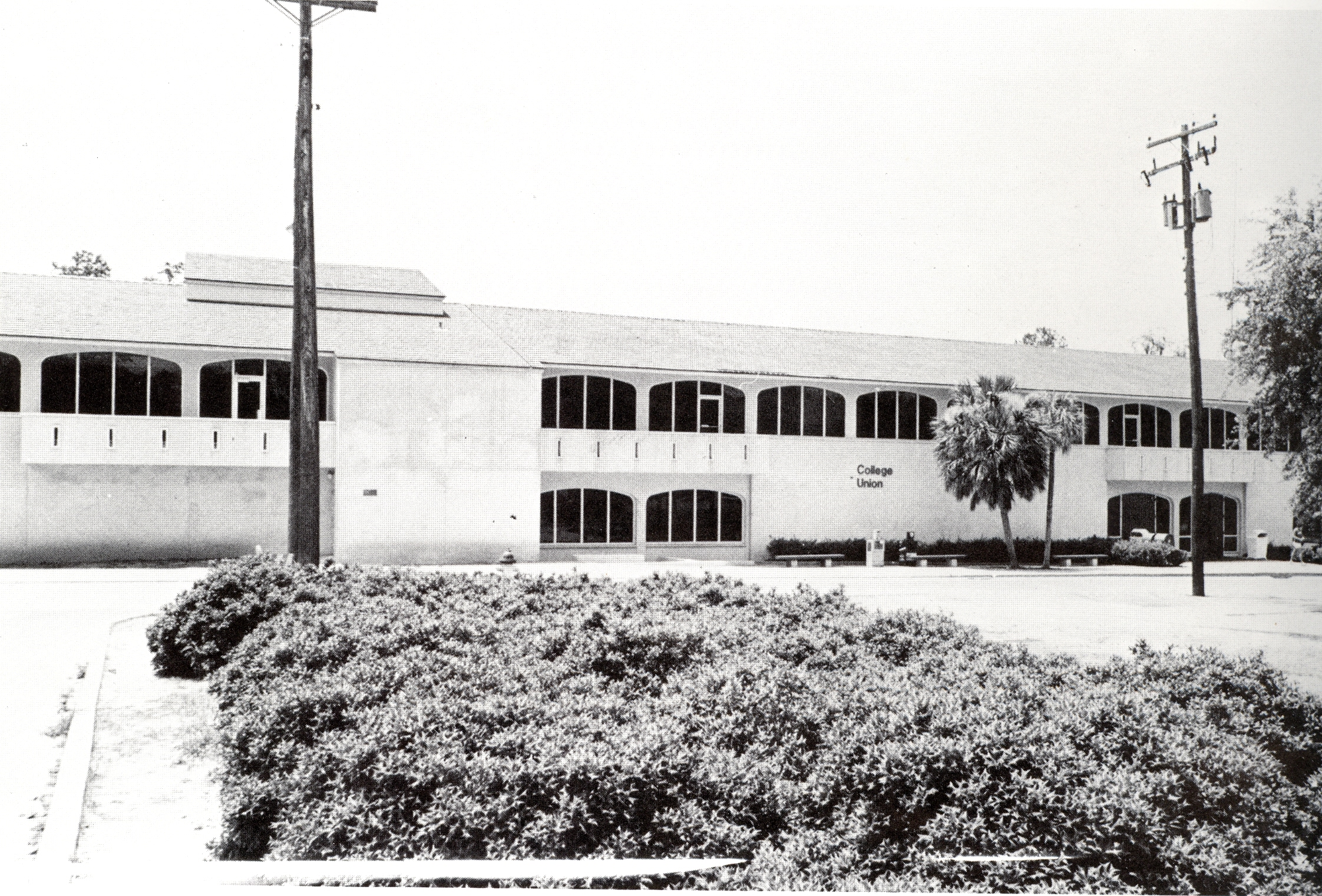
The former Union in 1976

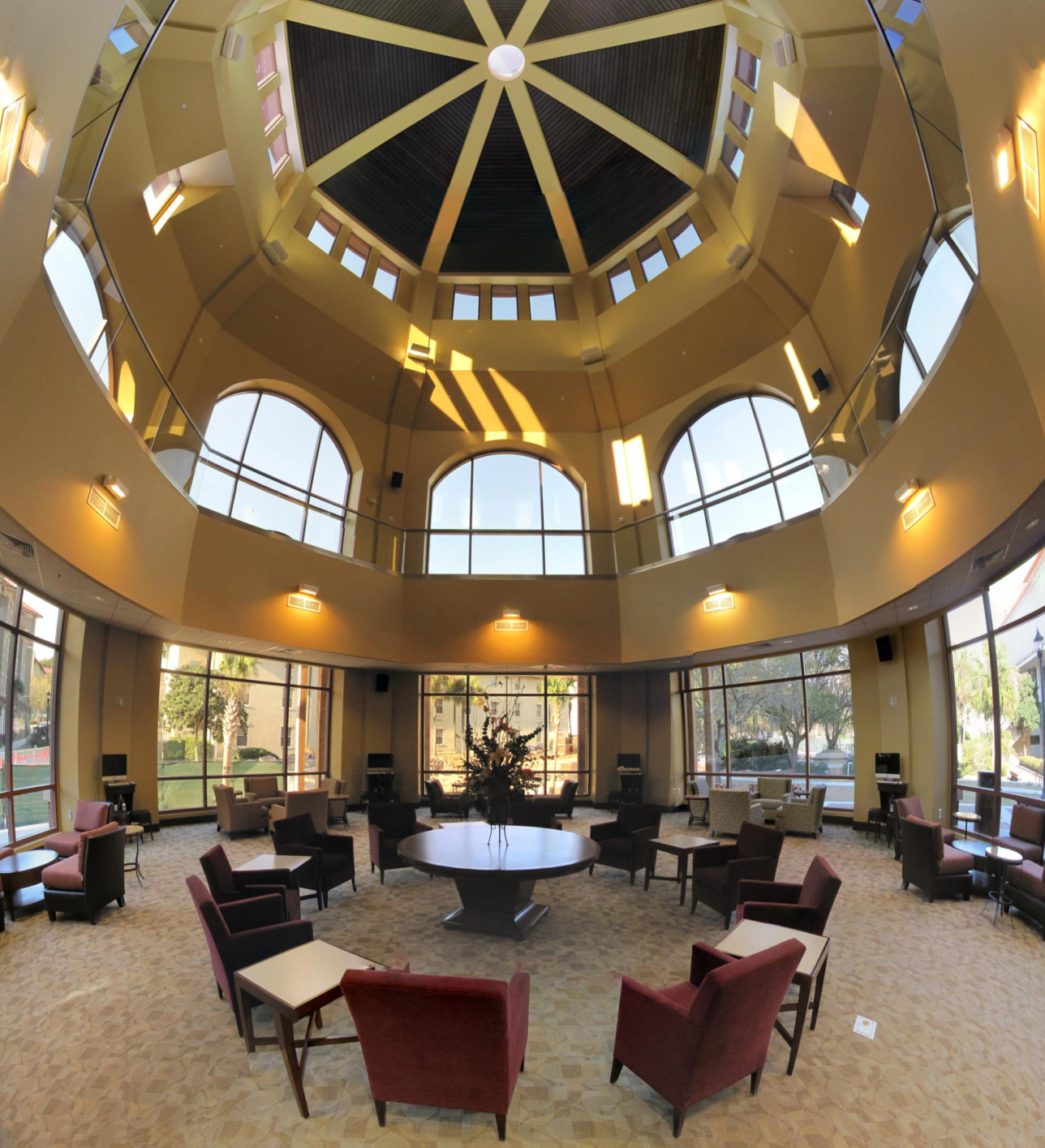
The rotunda in the new Student Union features lounge space and computer kiosks

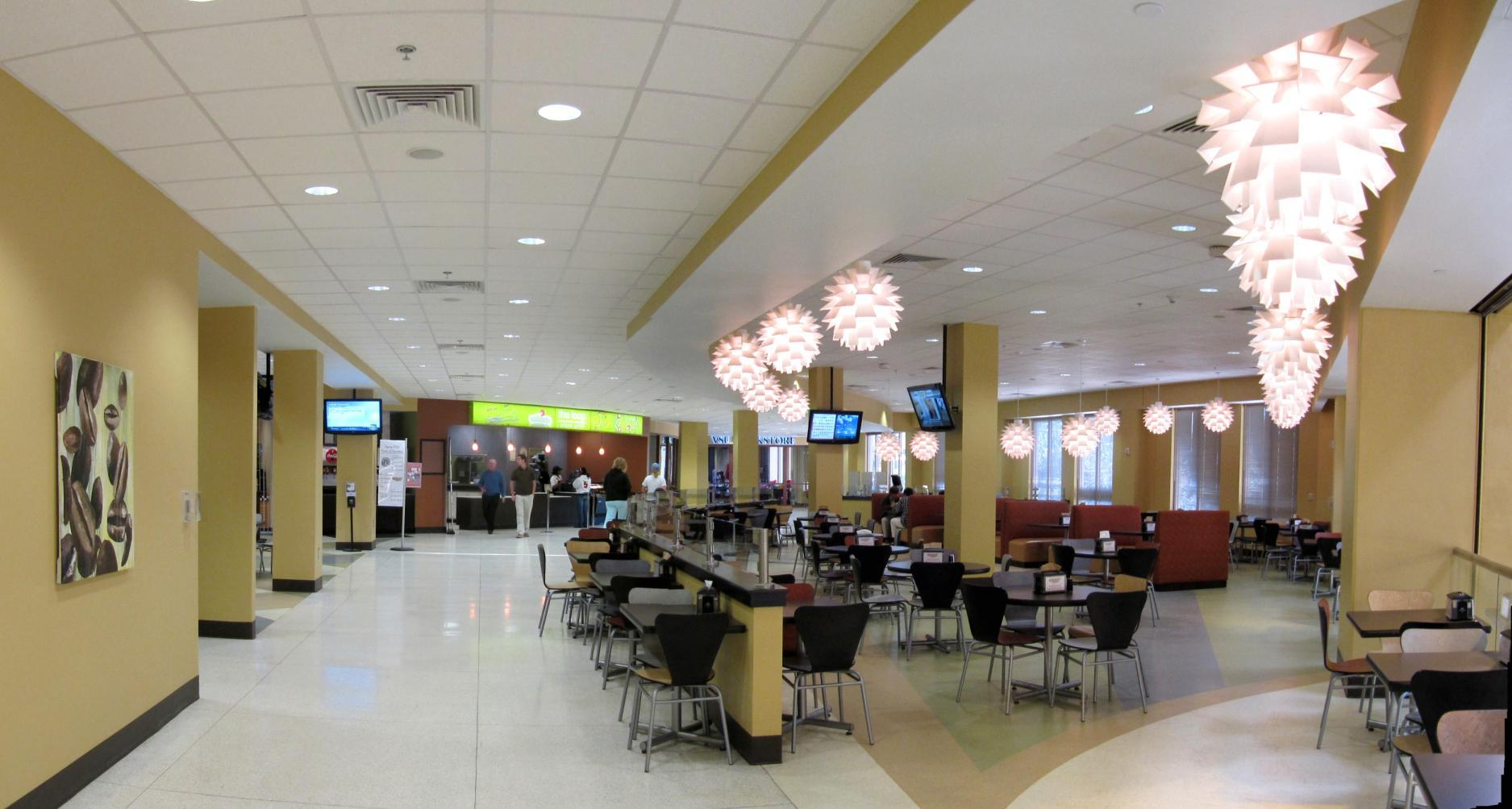
Food Court
