= Odum Library =

Coordinates: 30.847410°N 83.289284°W

Gertrude Gilmer Odum Library
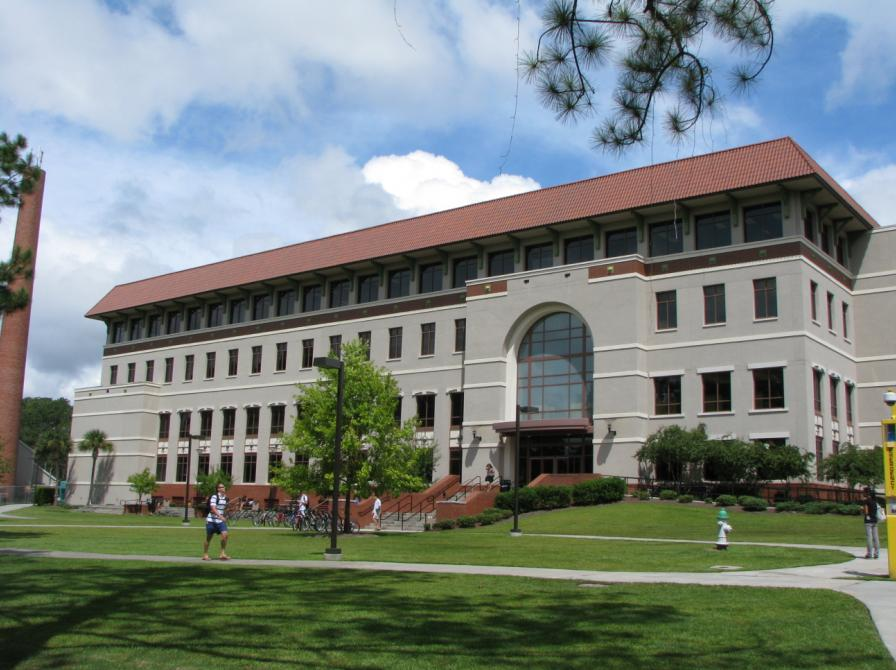
- Type: Academic library
- Established: 1972
- Location: Valdosta, Georgia, United States
- Campus: Main Campus
- Website: www.valdosta.edu/academics/library/

The Gertrude Gilmer Odum Library is the library of Valdosta State University in Valdosta, Georgia, United States. It is named after Gertrude Gilmer Odum, who was Professor Emerita of English.

== History ==
Valdosta State College had been serviced by Powell Library since 1940 but at 25,421 square feet (2,361.7 m^{2}) the building had grown outdated and was too small to accommodate the expanding student population since the institution became co-educational in 1950.

Construction began in 1970 of a new 84,551-square-foot (7,855.0 m^{2}) library. The new facility, located at the heart of the main campus, was dedicated in 1972. The library continued the themes of exterior stucco finish and red clay tile roof like other buildings of the main campus but broke from the tradition of Spanish mission style architecture and was built in a very modern style of the era.

In August 1990, the Georgia Board of Regents named the Library in honor of Gertrude Gilmer Odum, a major benefactor and Professor Emerita of English.

== Expansion ==
In 2004, a four-story $14.2 million addition opened off the south side of the existing building. Adding 95,000 square feet (8,800 m^{2}) the new addition doubles the size of the library. Clearing of the site began August 2001 and was completed in November 2003. The new facility includes an internet café, computer labs, Georgia Library Learning Online (GALILEO) technology center, reading rooms, expanded study space, 100-seat auditorium, new book stacks, media services, increased multimedia and digital editing capabilities and a new temperature controlled archives section. The addition maintains the Spanish Mission architecture with stucco exterior and clay tile roof. There is an exterior patio located on the south side of the building which faces One Mile Branch, a stream flowing through the VSU campus.

== Materials ==
Odum Library also houses approximately 549,683 bound volumes, and nearly 3,000 current periodicals and newspapers and a microform collection of over a million units. The Odum Library is a Selective Depository of U.S. Government documents and maintains the Archives of Contemporary South Georgia History and a Southern History Collection.
