= Valdosta State University =

Public university in Valdosta, Georgia, US

- Former names: South Georgia State Normal College (1913–1922); Georgia State Woman's College (1922–1950); Valdosta State College (1950–1993)
- Type: Public university
- Established: 1906; 120 years ago
- Parent institution: University System of Georgia
- Endowment: $20.8 million
- President: William R. Crowe
- Students: 10,308 (fall 2024)
- Location: Valdosta, Georgia, U.S. 30.8470°N 83.2896°W
- Campus: 168 acres (68 ha)
- Colors: Red and black
- Nickname: Blazers
- Sporting affiliations: NCAA Division II – Gulf South
- Mascot: Blaze
- Website: valdosta.edu
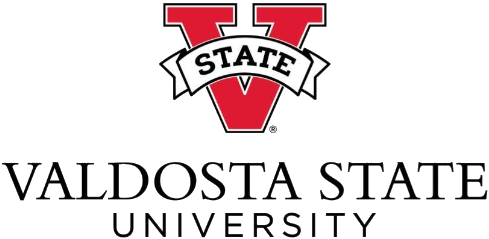

Valdosta State University (VSU or Valdosta State) is a public university in Valdosta, Georgia, United States. Founded in 1906, it launched in 1913 as an all-girls college. VSU is one of the four comprehensive universities in the University System of Georgia. As of 2019, VSU had over 12,000 undergraduate and graduate students. VSU also offers classes at Moody Air Force Base, located northeast of Valdosta in Lowndes County.

== History ==
=== South Georgia State Normal College (1913–1922) ===
The school that would become Valdosta State University was founded in 1906. Colonel W.S. West led the legislation through the Georgia Senate, and C.R. Ashley and E.J. McRee pushed it through the House. However, no funds were appropriated for it until 1911 when the state allocated $25,000. The city of Valdosta raised $50,000, and Col. West gave the property that is now the main part of campus to the state for use by the new institution. The president chosen was Richard Holmes Powell. His travels in the American southwest led him to choose the Spanish Mission style of architecture for the institution's buildings. In January 1913, the school opened as South Georgia State Normal College (SGSNC) with three college freshmen and 15 sub-freshmen. The early students were required to wear a school uniform and paid $10 per year for tuition and $12 per month for food and board. Most became teachers and studied subjects such as literature, physics and agriculture. In 1922, the school became a four-year college and the legislature changed the name to Georgia State Womans College.

=== Georgia State Woman's College (1922–1950) ===
President Powell headed the GSWC until 1933 when he was made dean of the Coordinate College in Athens. Jere M. Pound, President of the Georgia Teachers College, was sent to Valdosta. However, his tenure at GSWC lasted less than a year before he had to go on sick leave. He died a year later.

Frank Robertson Reade assumed the job of acting president in 1934 and on Pound's death became president. During his tenure, New Deal programs enabled the school to expand physically from three to seven buildings. The Powell Library, dedicated by Eleanor Roosevelt, was a centerpiece of this construction. During World War II, GSWC emphasized politics and science in its curriculum and in 1943, the B.S. degree was added. Moody Airfield, located nine miles from campus, provided the male participants for many patriotic parties.

=== Valdosta State College (1950–1993) ===
Reade served until 1948, he was followed by J. Ralph Thaxton, who came from the University of Georgia, where he had served as professor, Dean, Director of Admissions, and Registrar. Soon after Thaxton began his service, the Board of Regents, acting on the advice of a committee which had examined the whole University System of Georgia, declared that in 1950 GSWC was to become co-educational—Valdosta State College (VSC).

Programs in premedical, pre dentistry, and pre pharmacy were added, and the sciences became more prominent. Business became a popular major after 1950. By 1956 men on campus outnumbered the women. Greek organizations were formed, with fraternities leading the way, and intercollegiate athletics became a part of campus life when the Rebels, an all-male basketball team, was formed.

In 1953 VSC acquired the property of the former Emory Jr. College, a private all-male school that operated from 1928 to 1953, less than a mile away, and the facilities became the north campus which now house the College of Business, College of Nursing and Health Sciences, and Air Force ROTC.

Under Thaxton's tenure, the college integrated in 1963. Over the next decade, the college added African-American students, faculty and administrators.

Thaxton retired in 1966, and S. Walter Martin, former president of Emory University and Vice Chancellor of the University System of Georgia, assumed the presidency. He presided over a time of physical expansion of the school, including the construction of such buildings as the Odum Library, the Education Center, The Fine Arts Building, the College Union, a Science Administration Building and six dormitories. The student body grew, the School of Nursing was established, and many programs expanded, including those in graduate education.

Presidents of Valdosta State
President	Years
Richard Holmes Powell	1913–1933
Jere Madison Pound	1933–1935
Frank Robertson Reade	1935–1948
James Ralph Thaxton	1948–1966
Sidney Walter Martin	1966–1978
Hugh Coleman Bailey	1978–2001
Ronald M. Zaccari	2002–2008
Patrick J. Schloss	2008–2011
William J. McKinney	2012–2015
Richard A. Carvajal	2017–2025
William R. Crowe	2025-Present

=== Valdosta State University (1993–present) ===
When Martin retired in 1978, Hugh Coleman Bailey assumed the post. Under Bailey, the school had doubled in size from 4,500 to 9,000 students. From 1978 to 1993, numerous programs were added and existing courses upgraded, resulting in the early 1980s in an endeavor to make VSC a university. Throughout the 1980s the college established off-campus sites and course offerings and began receiving state and federal grant funds to develop curriculum and programs. In 1993, all the hard work and planning paid off. Valdosta State College became Valdosta State University (VSU), the second regional university in the University System of Georgia. In fall 1998, Valdosta State University adopted the semester system, along with other units of the University System of Georgia. Under Bailey's leadership VSU continued to grow with the addition of the 150,000-square-foot (14,000 m^{2}) University Center in the 1995 and a new science building in 2001.

In January 2002, Ronald M. Zaccari assumed the post and during his time in office VSU updated its infrastructure to accommodate student population growth, including the construction of four new dormitories and two parking decks. Patrick J. Schloss became the President of VSU in 2008 and was in office during the opening of a new Student Health Center, Georgia Residence Hall, and Student Union. William J. McKinney was announced as the new VSU president in 2012. On April 2, 2015, it was announced that McKinney would step down as president effective July 1, 2015.

In August 2015, interim president Cecil P. Staton citing a 17% decline in enrollment since its peak in 2011, announced that over thirty faculty and staff members would not have their contracts renewed at the end of the year. That decision was met with criticism by students and faculty, and has caused some to question the future of the institution.

== Location ==
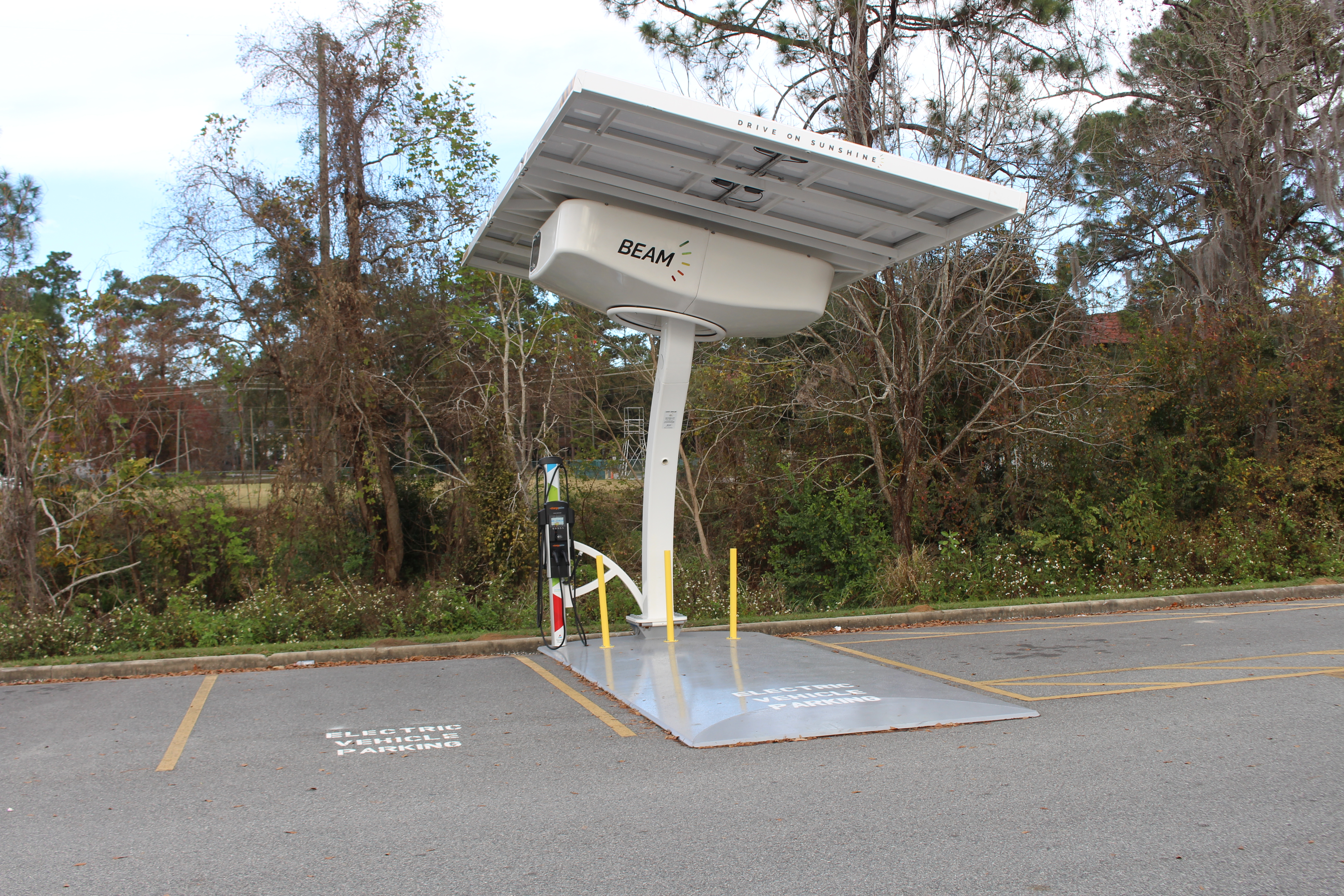
Solar-powered charging station at VSU makes travel more convenient to the surrounding community.

The city of Valdosta is located in South Georgia, just off of Interstate 75, approximately 20 miles (32 km) from the Florida state line. Valdosta is about a two-hour or less drive from Tallahassee, Macon, and Jacksonville, three hours from Orlando, Tampa, and Atlanta.

The Valdosta metropolitan area has a population of over 145,000 and the area offers many shopping areas including the Valdosta Mall, historic downtown Valdosta, multiple restaurants, a movie theater, a nearby theme park, art and history museums, and more.

The total economic impact of VSU related activities in the 2010 fiscal year brought in $537 million and 5,400 jobs to the Valdosta metropolitan area, or approximately 8 percent of the employed labor force in the Valdosta Metro area.

A study by Valdosta State University's Center for Business and Economic Research (CBER) shows that in the 2010–2011 school year VSU directly and indirectly generated 5,055 jobs and created an annual labor income impact of $208.7 million for the Valdosta Metropolitan Area. The Valdosta State staff includes 1,302 full-time and 526 part-time employees. VSU ranks within the top 10 employers for the Valdosta MSA.

== Campus ==
=== Main Campus ===
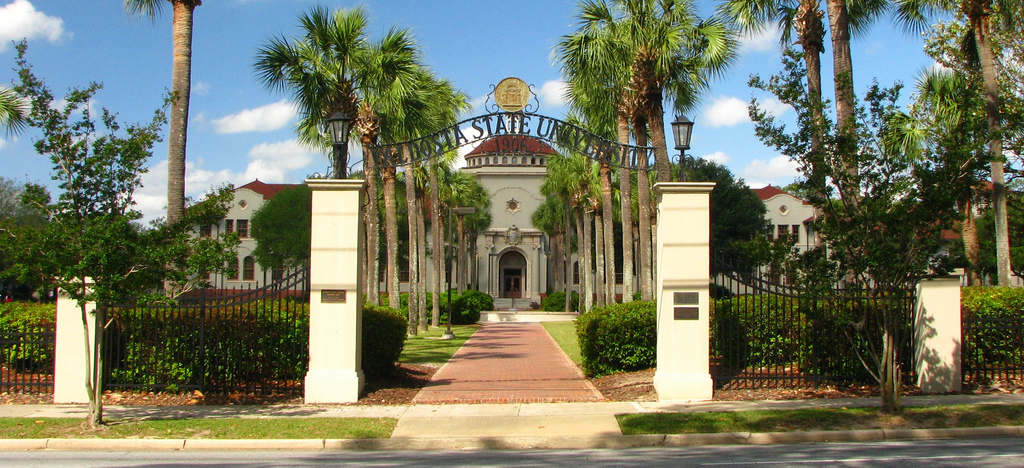
The archway at Valdosta State was presented to the college by the Alumni Association in 1960. It was refurbished in 1993 to celebrate Valdosta achieving University status

The VSU campus is divided into two areas: main, and north campus. The main campus houses much of the academic and administrative departments and is recognized for its Spanish Mission architecture theme of every building. The 85-acre (34 ha) Main Campus faces North Patterson Street, one of the city's main thoroughfares. In total, 85 buildings located across 168 acres (68 ha) make up the Valdosta State University campus. Other units of the university are located in satellite facilities adjacent to the campus and along Patterson Street. The campuses and principal satellite buildings are connected by the university bus service, operating regularly throughout each class day.

==== West Hall ====
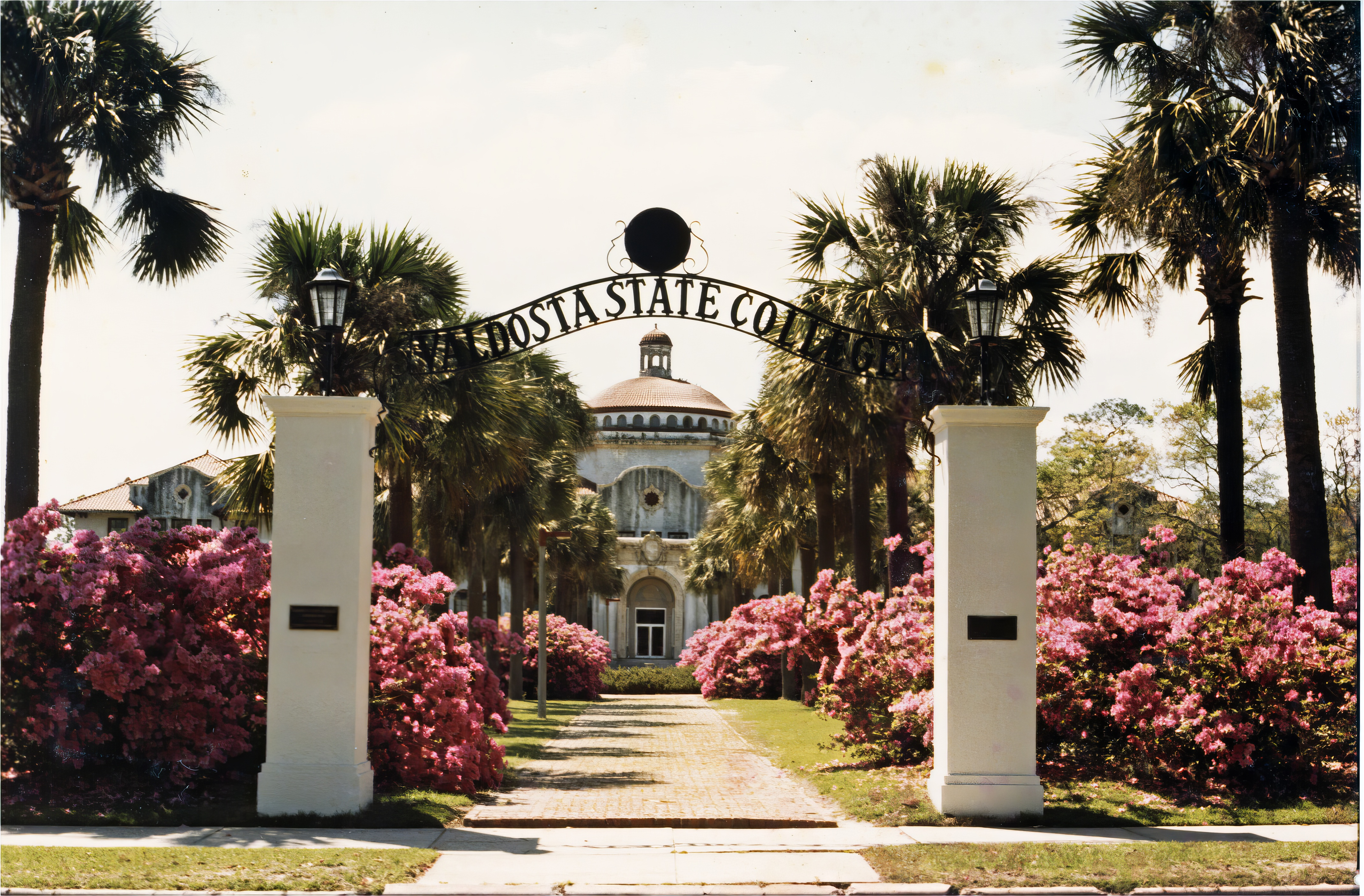
West Hall and the gates with the azaleas in bloom, Spring 1986, when it was named Valdosta State College

Built in 1917, West Hall, is the oldest building at Valdosta State University and has long been known as the symbol of the university due to its distinctive dome and Spanish-mission architecture. It is also the center of academic activity at VSU, housing the Administrative Offices of the President and Vice President for Academic Affairs. The Departments of English, Political Science, and Modern and Classical Languages are also located in West Hall. In addition, this building houses the Public Administration Programs, Department of Modern and Classical Languages Department, Department of English, Department of Political Sciences, and numerous classrooms.

==== Odum Library ====
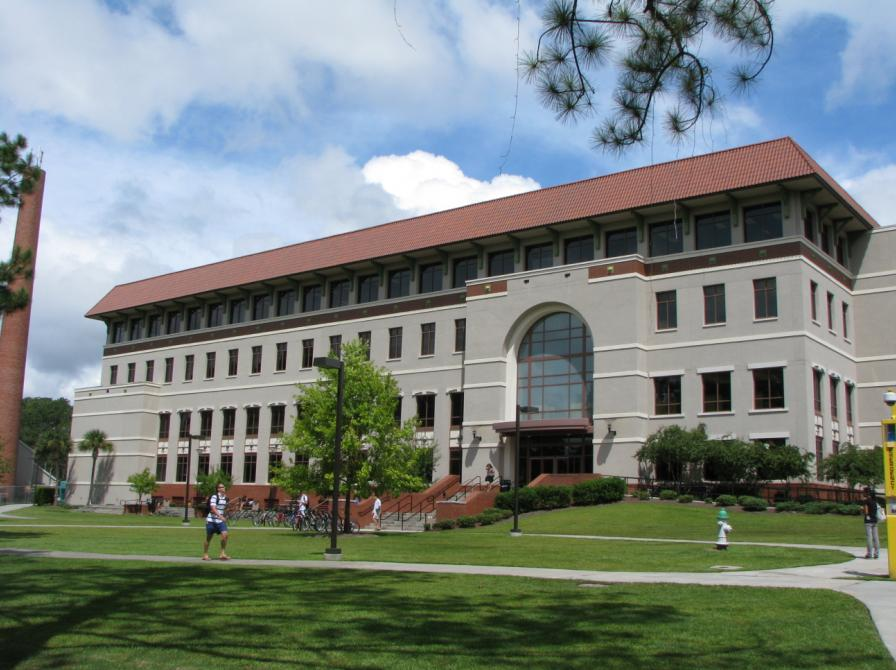
Odum Library

The Gertrude Gilmer Odum Library built in 1971 at 85,000 square feet (7,900 m^{2}), serves as the main library of Valdosta State University. In 2004, a 95,000-square-foot (8,800 m^{2}) addition was built off the southern portion of the building doubling the size of Odum Library. Distinctive features of the addition include a 24-hour internet cafe, the GALILEO Technology Center, electronic classrooms, auditorium, expanded Media Center, climate-controlled Archives, new study areas, and additional book shelving.

The nearly 180,000-square-foot (17,000 m^{2}) library houses approximately 453,757 bound volumes, and nearly 3,000 current periodicals and newspapers and a microform collection of over a million units. The Odum Library is a Selective Depository of U.S. Government documents and maintains the Archives of Contemporary South Georgia History and a Southern History Collection. In November 2013, VSU announced it would expand its sustainability efforts by adding a solar canopy behind the library.

==== Student Union ====
The 113,604-square-foot (10,554.2 m^{2}) Valdosta State Student Union serves as the social center of Valdosta State. It offers students a one-story bookstore, 300-seat theater, game room, large dividable multi-purpose room with a capacity for over 500 people, ample lounge space, meeting rooms, student organization offices and a food court featuring Starbucks, Moe's Southwest Grill, and Chick-fil-A. The previous Student Union was too small to accommodate the growing student population at VSU and in the fall of 2008, was demolished for construction of the new Student Union which opened in 2010.

==== Bailey Science Center ====
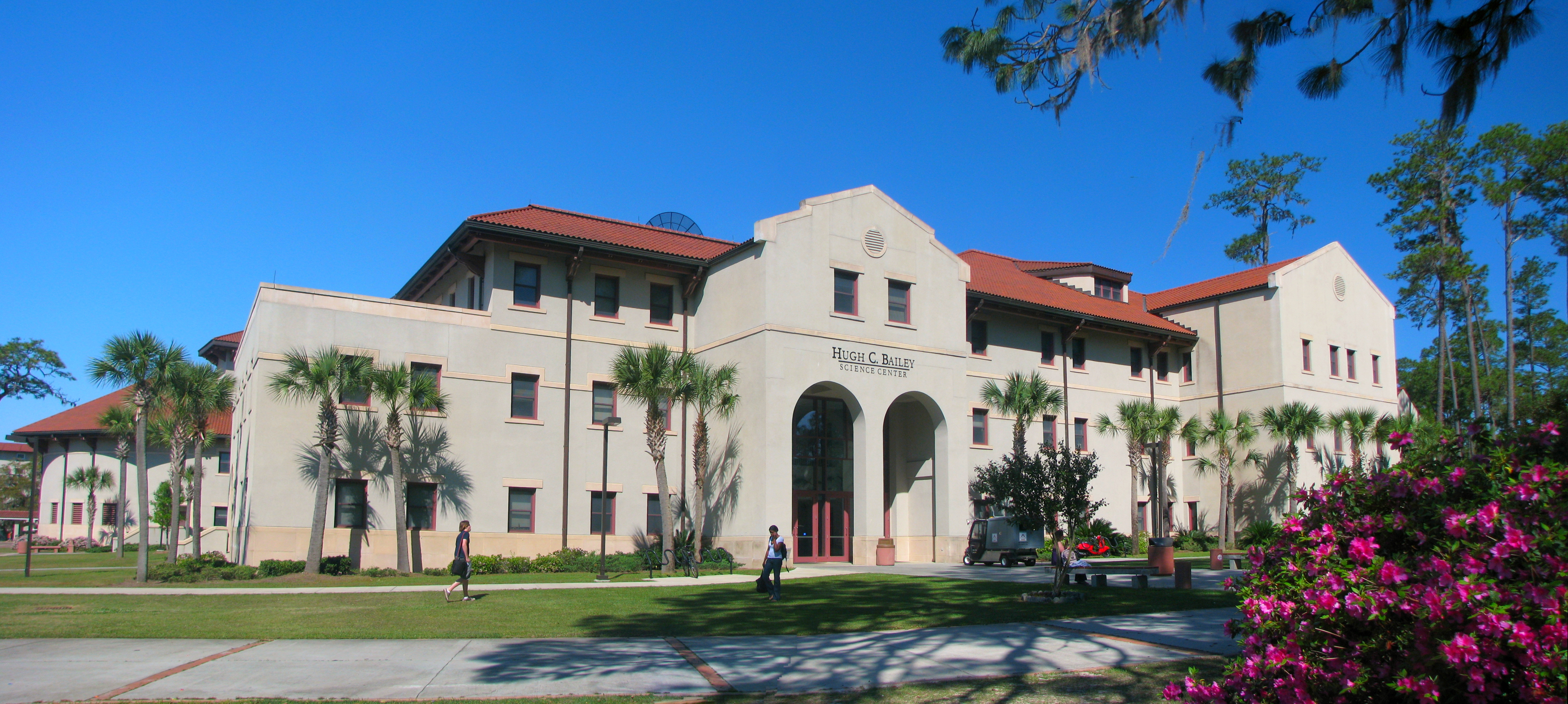
Hugh C. Bailey Science Center

The Hugh C. Bailey Science Center serves as the home of the Biology and Chemistry Departments. The facility is named after former VSU President Hugh C. Bailey who served from 1978 to 2001. The building has 22 teaching and 19 research laboratories that occupy the entire north side of the building. In addition, it has four greenhouses on the rooftop; 11 classrooms, including four 48 seat classrooms, and one 96 seat classroom; a large auditorium which seats 275, and a smaller auditorium which seats 148; two conference rooms and 41 offices.

=== North Campus ===
The Rea and Lillian Steele North Campus, located less than a mile, approximately ten blocks, north of the VSU main campus and is home to the Harley Langdale Jr. School of Business Administration, Air Force ROTC Detachment 172, Billy Grant Field, home of the VSU baseball team, and the VSU Softball Complex. The campus is the former home of Emory Junior College, an all-male two-year private institution that served as a branch of Emory University based in Atlanta. The property was sold to Valdosta State in 1950 after it transitioned from an all-female school to co-educational. The buildings follow a red-brick modified form of Georgian architecture.

=== Jewel Whitehead Camellia Trail ===
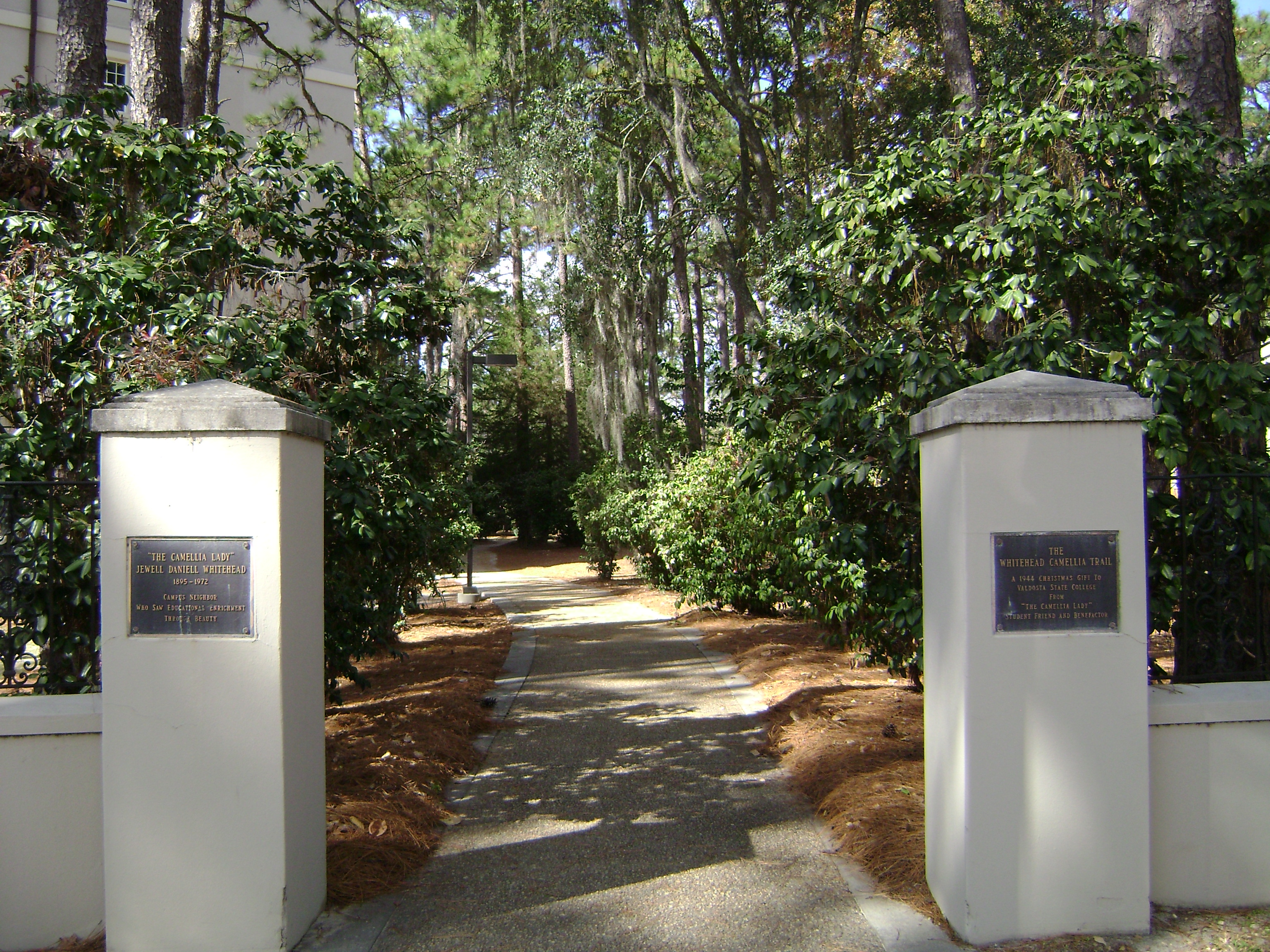
Whitehead Camelia Trail entrance

The Camellia Trail is believed to be the only such trail on a university campus in the nation. Located in the northwest area of the Main Campus, more than 1,100 camellias of many varieties form a winding 3,000-foot-long (910 m) trail through the towering pines. The trail was a 1944 Christmas gift to the university from the late Mr. and Mrs. R. B. Whitehead of Valdosta. A memorial gateway honors the collection's founder, "The Camellia Lady," Jewell Whitehead.

=== Outdoor Art Collection ===
The Valdosta State campus features six metal sculptures as part of an expanding outdoor art collection. "Cormorant" by Harry McDaniel of North Carolina was the first sculpture installed during the summer of 2011 outside of the Fine Arts Building on the corner of Brookwood Drive and Oak Street. "Three Spheres" by Hoss Haley, also from North Carolina, is located on the north side of the Fine Arts Building. "Fly Away Too" by Andrew Light of Tallahassee, Florida, is outside the College of Education on Baytree Road. "Black Bird," located between Odum Library and the Student Union, was created and donated by the university's seventh president, Ronald M. Zaccari. Charles E. Hook's "Fenris" located outside the north entrance Odum Library, was added in June 2012. Most recently "Guardian" by Tallahassee artist Mark Dickson was installed in July 2012 between Odum Library and the Fine Arts Building.

== Academics ==
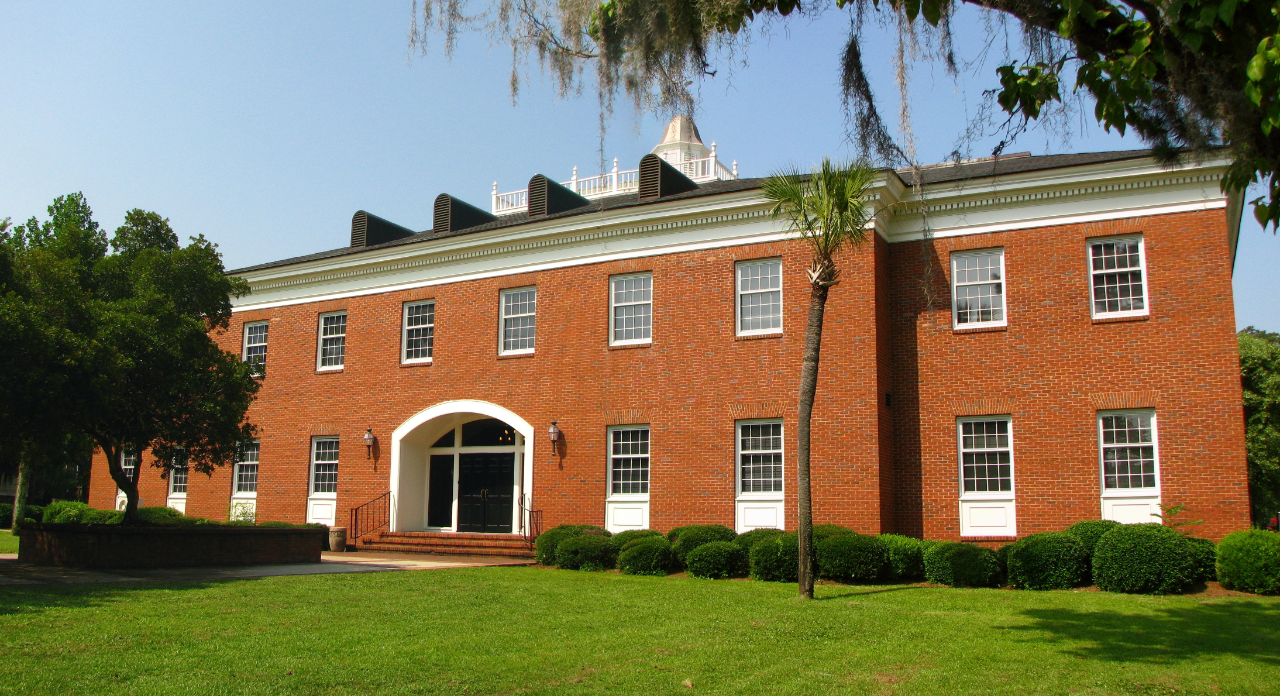
Martin Hall, home of the College of Nursing

=== Colleges ===
Valdosta State is organized into six colleges offering 55 undergraduate degree programs and 50 graduate programs and degrees.

- College of Science and Mathematics – Academic Departments include Biology, Chemistry, Mathematics, Computer Science, Physics, Astronomy, and Geosciences.
- College of Humanities and Social Sciences – The college includes degree programs in Humanities, including Modern and Classical Languages, English, and Philosophy and Religious Studies. The college also includes degree programs in Social Sciences including History, Political Science, and Sociology, Anthropology and Criminal Science.
- College of the Arts – The college includes the Department of Art and Design, the Department of Communication Arts, and the Department of Music. The College of the Arts maintains a calendar of performing arts, visual arts, television, radio programming, and other arts activities that are available to students, faculty and the general public. The Peach State Summer Theatre held at VSU is designated as the Official Musical Theatre of the State of Georgia.
- Harley Langdale Jr. College of Business Administration – Located on the VSU North Campus the school is composed of the Department of Accounting, Department of Economics, Finance, and Healthcare Administration, and Department of Management and Marketing.
- James L. and Dorothy H. Dewar College of Education & Human Services – Departments include Communication Sciences and Disorders, Leadership, Technology, and Workforce Development, Teacher Education, Human Services, and Library and Information Studies.
- College of Nursing & Health Sciences – The Nursing Program was founded at Valdosta State College in 1968. The program offers Undergraduate and Graduate programs for nursing and Exercise Physiology, as well as an undergraduate program in Health Sciences.

=== Undergraduate ===
Valdosta State University offers undergraduate work leading to the following degrees: Associate of Applied Science, the Associate of Arts, the Associate of Science, the Bachelor of Arts in thirteen major programs, the Bachelor of Science in fifteen major programs, the Bachelor of Science in education in eight major programs, the Bachelor of Business Administration in eight major programs, the Bachelor of Fine Arts in six major programs, the Bachelor of Music, and the Bachelor of Science in nursing. Valdosta State also offers a selective honors college for high-achieving undergraduate students.

=== Graduate ===
Graduate degrees offered include the Master of Education in ten major programs, the Master of Arts in four major programs, the Master of Arts in Teaching in nine major programs, the Master of Science in six major programs, the Master of Public Administration, the Master of Business Administration, the Master of Accountancy, the Master of Science in nursing, the Master of Music Performance, the Master of Social Work, the Master of Library and Information Science, the Education Specialist in six major programs, the Doctor of Education in three major programs, the Doctor of Speech-Language Pathology, the Doctor of Public Administration, and the Doctor of Nursing Practice. New baccalaureate and graduate degree programs are added from time to time to meet the needs of the population served by the university.

== Accreditation ==
Valdosta State University is accredited by the Commission on Colleges of the Southern Association of Colleges and Schools to award associate, bachelor's, master's, educational specialist, and doctoral degrees. The Harley Langdale Jr. College of Business Administration is accredited by AACSB International(Association to Advance Collegiate Schools of Business). The MLIS program is ALA (American Library Association) accredited.

== Student life ==
Undergraduate demographics as of Fall 2023
Race and ethnicity	Total
White	44%
Black	38%
Hispanic	11%
Two or more races	4%
Asian	1%
International student	1%
Economic diversity
Low-income (Note: The percentage of students who received an income-based federal Pell grant intended for low-income students.)	53%
Affluent (Note: The percentage of students who are a part of the American middle class at the bare minimum.)	47%

There are over 200 recognized student organizations offered at VSU. Opportunities for students include VSU's student radio station 90.9FM, weekly newspaper (The Spectator), and annual literary publication (Odradek). The Student Recreation Center provides students with facilities such as an indoor pool, track, racquetball, volleyball and basketball courts, weight rooms, a cardio area, rock climbing wall, and more.

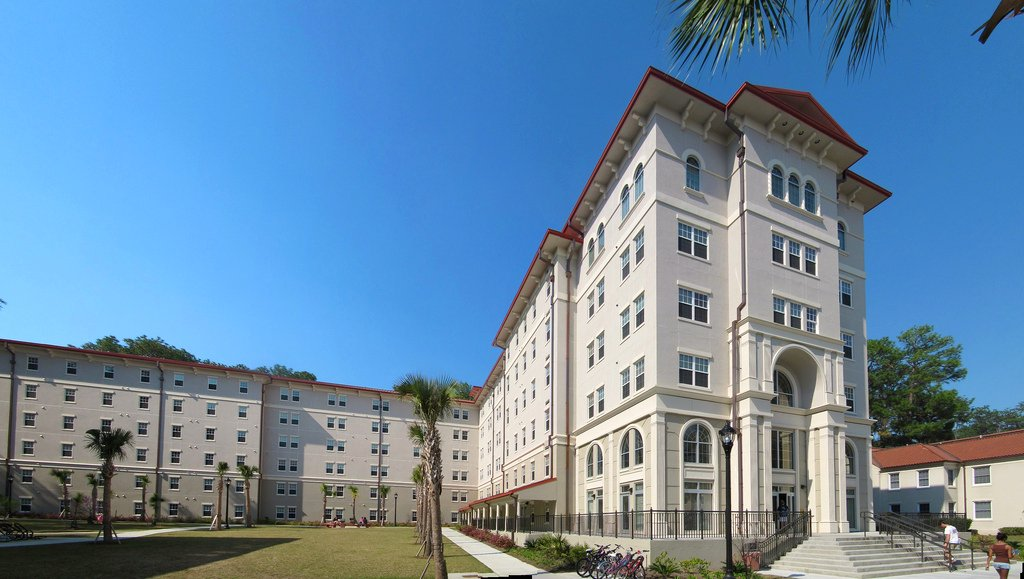
Georgia Hall, completed in 2009, is the latest residence hall at VSU

=== Housing ===
Valdosta State University offers seven traditional residence halls and two apartment-style buildings located throughout the campus. Approximately 90% of the enrolled students at VSU live in the residence halls and on-campus apartments.

=== Greek life ===
Approximately 10% of undergraduate students are members of Fraternities or Sororities. There are dozens of fraternities and sororities at VSU. The school's Greek organizations are members of the Collegiate Panhellenic Council (CPC), Interfraternity Council (IFC), and National Pan-Hellenic Council (NPHC).

=== The Spectator ===
The Spectator is the independent student newspaper of Valdosta State University, published every Thursday morning during each Fall and Spring Semester. The Spectator began in 1936 as the Campus Canopy but changed its name to The Spectator some years later. It contains latest campus news, local news, opinions, features, entertainment, and sports.

=== Omnino ===
Omnino is an online undergraduate research journal at Valdosta. The journal was founded by students in 2011.

=== WVVS-FM ===
WVVS-FM is a student-operated radio station broadcasting at 90.9 FM. The station broadcast throughout the year as is possible with a volunteer student and faculty staff. The station first signed on the air in July 1971, and operated out of the old Student Union building. With the replacement of that building the station moved to the south side of campus.

== Athletics and traditions ==
=== Sports ===
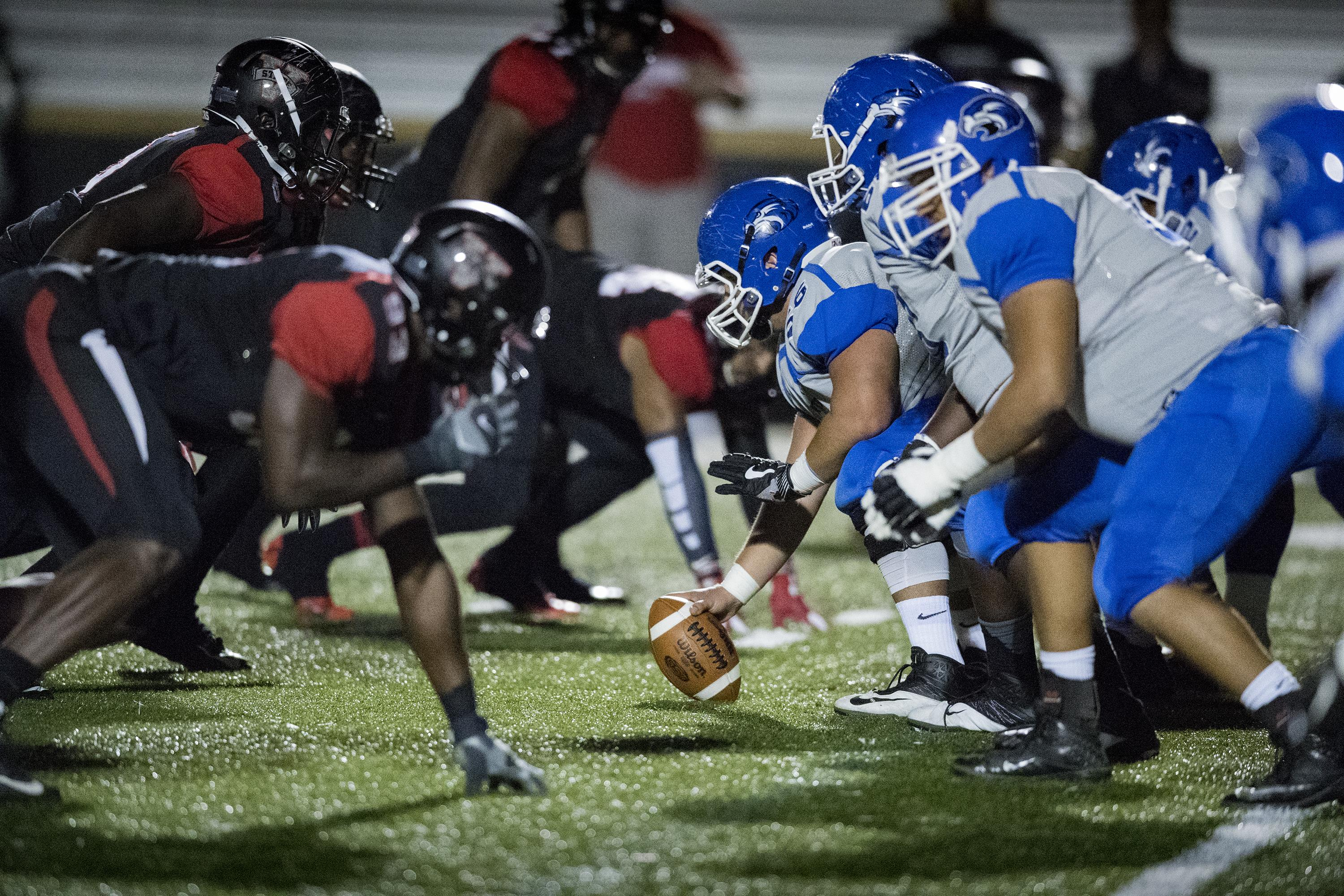
Players from Valdosta State University and Shorter University line up during a military appreciation game, November 12, 2016.

The Valdosta State Blazers compete in football, basketball, baseball, tennis, golf and cross-country. "Lady Blazers" compete in basketball, softball, tennis, volleyball, cross-country, and soccer. The school's team was previously known as the Rebels until the name was changed to the Blazers in the 1970s. VSU is an NCAA Division II member institution and has been a member of the Gulf South Conference since 1981. Valdosta State's first national championship was in baseball in 1979. Valdosta State University football teams won the Division II National Championship four times (2004, 2007, 2012, 2018) and also played in the title game in 2002, 2021, and 2024. The men's tennis team has won four national titles (2006, 2011, 2024, and 2025) and also played for the national championship in three other seasons (2004, 2007, and 2010). The Lady Blazers softball team won the national championship in 2012, falling in title match appearances in 2010 and 2014. Valdosta State also has a rugby club, VSU Rugby.

== Free speech controversies ==
=== 2007 suspension of student Hayden Barnes ===
In May 2007, T. Hayden Barnes, a student at Valdosta State University, was "administratively withdrawn" for criticizing the construction of two new parking garages on campus in a manner that University President Ronald Zaccari, over the objection of other administrators, deemed to be indicative of Barnes posing a clear and present danger to the VSU campus. In January 2008, Barnes filed a civil rights lawsuit against the university, VSU President Ronald Zaccari, the Board of Regents of the University System of Georgia, and other VSU administrators. In 2021, Barnes won his legal battle against past university president Zaccari. In July 2015, the university's insurers settled the case for $900,000.

=== 2014 deactivation of adjunct professor Mark Patrick George ===
On July 28, 2014, Valdosta State University deactivated the email account of adjunct sociology professor Mark P. George. This deactivation occurred one day after George sent a letter to Georgia officials criticizing the state's funding of Confederate History Month and other Confederate events and memorials. In June 2014, George had sent an earlier open letter to Governor Nathan Deal and state legislature staff via his university email account. Professor George was also the long-time director of the Mary Turner Project, a program dedicated to raising awareness of a 1918 Lowndes County lynching spree which included the death of Mary Turner. Funds for the Mary Turner Project were frozen at the same time as the deletion of George's email.

George's email account was deactivated following a July 11 complaint by VSU alumnus and Sons of Confederate Veterans member, John Cooper Hall Jr., to VSU president William McKinney. After initially supporting George's actions as an instance of free speech, McKinney was instructed by the University System of Georgia's External Affairs to remove George's access to university email. VSU stated the position that George's action violated rules against using university materials for a political agenda. A meeting was arranged between McKinney and George in August, from which George departed dissatisfied. In response to George's account being deactivated, John Cooper Hall Jr. responded, "Cry me a river. It's not like the Confederate Army went down there and hung him." George later voluntarily left VSU for a job elsewhere.

In late October 2014, McKinney ordered an independent investigation into the ongoing clash. While George considered the shutdown of his email politically motivated, John Cooper Hall Jr. claimed that it was a consequence of George's personal attacks against Hall. McKinney refused to comment on the matter while the independent investigation was ongoing. Hall's initial letter to McKinney complained that George was trying "to use racial politics to affect the upcoming election" with his campaign against Georgia's funding Confederate related matters, and made no mention of personal attacks. In late January 2015, the independent investigation announced that President McKinney committed no wrongdoing regarding Mark George.
