= Housing at the University of Georgia =

Housing at the University of Georgia is managed by the Department of University Housing. On campus housing for undergraduate students is divided into ten communities, and for graduate students into three communities.

== Undergraduate housing ==
=== Traditional halls ===
Brumby, Russell, and Creswell halls are collectively known as the "freshman high-rises" due to their similarities in design and function. All three are located just off Baxter Street on West Campus. These are the biggest residence halls on campus and house a total of about 2,850 freshman. All three buildings were built on the site of the former Linnentown, a predominantly African-American neighborhood, which was demolished for their construction.

==== Brumby Community ====
Brumby Community is a formerly all-female residence hall constructed in 1966. It is nine stories tall and houses approximately 935 students. Rooms are double-occupancy with shared bathrooms, and the community is divided into four colonies: Darien, Newport, Sunbury, and Wentworth.

The Brumby Community, which includes Brumby Hall, is one of three high rise residential communities located on Baxter Street and designated solely to first-year students. Beginning fall 2013, Brumby Hall will be coed with each wing designated as male or female.

The Brumby Community is home to several academic and leadership initiatives. Students of the Franklin College of Arts and Sciences are able to complete academic advising through the Franklin College in the Residence Halls program with one of two advisers assigned to this residence hall, and short courses and seminars are regularly scheduled for the Brumby conference rooms. Brumby Hall's famous rotunda is the site of many events and activities. This residence hall is also home to a satellite office of the Division of Academic Enhancement, which provides tutoring and other academic support services to residents.

Brumby Hall was renovated in 2020, and updated to include freestanding furniture in rooms, more programmatic spaces, more bathroom privacy and in-room temperature control. Brumby’s iconic rotunda is a popular gathering space for students.

==== Creswell Hall ====
Named after Mary Ethel Creswell, the first woman to receive a degree from the University of Georgia, Creswell Hall is a nine-story co-ed residence hall housing approximately 965 students and is divided into four colonies: Frederica, Gordon, Goshen, and Ogeechee. It has double-occupancy rooms with common bathrooms. The residence hall is designated solely for first-year students, and is also located near the Bolton Dining Commons.

==== Black-Diallo-Miller Hall ====
Completed in 2022, Black-Diallo-Miller Hall houses first-year students in double-occupancy rooms. It was constructed in the former location of the old Bolton Dining Commons at the intersection of Baxter Street and E Cloverhurst Avenue.

In December 2021, the building was officially named in honor of Harold A. Black, Mary Blackwell Diallo, and Kerry Rushin Miller, the first African American students to enroll as freshmen and complete their undergraduate degrees.

==== Russell Community ====
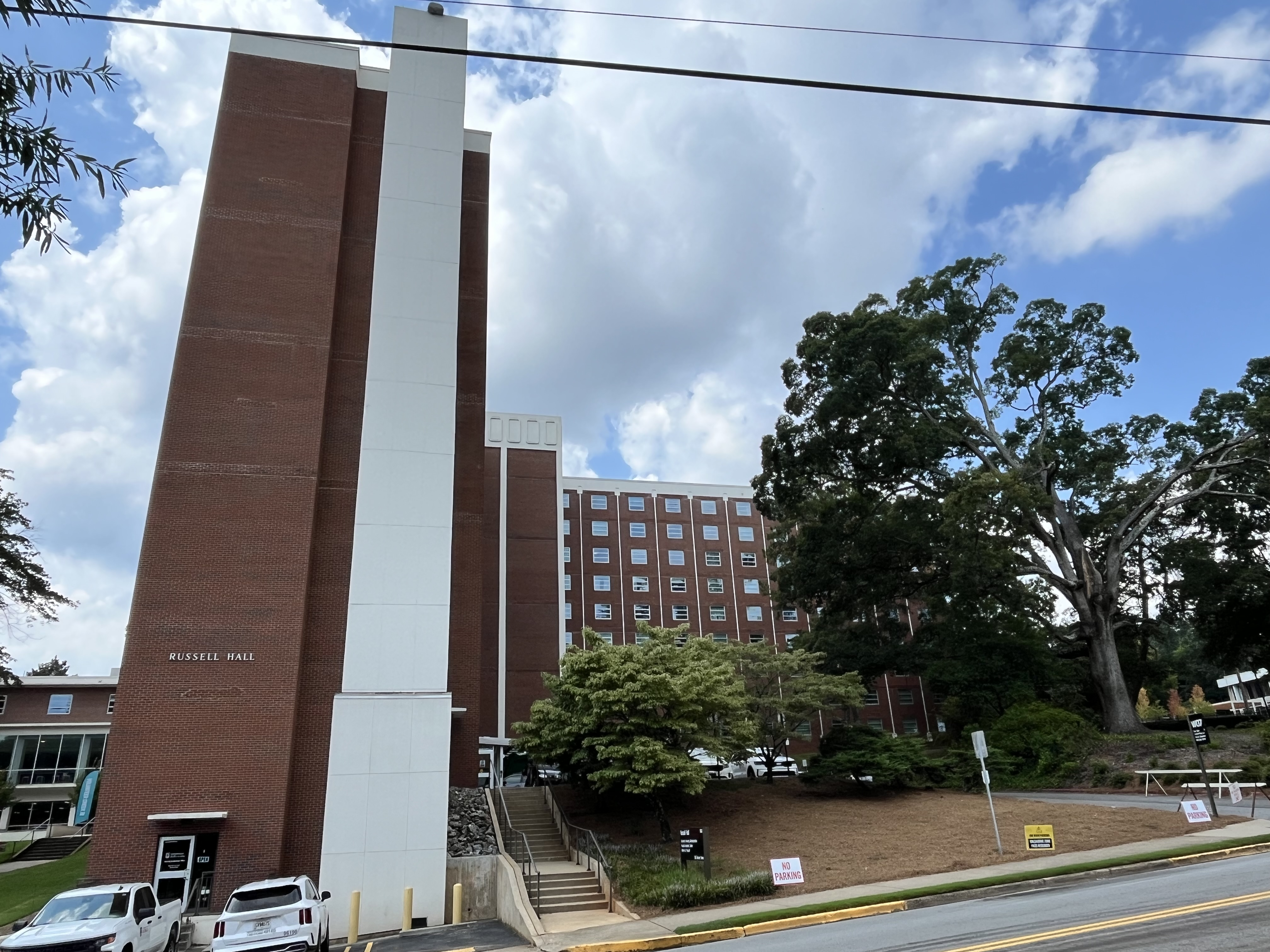
Russell Hall

The Russell Community, which includes Russell Hall, is one of three high-rise residential communities located on Baxter Street designated solely to first-year students. Russell is coeducational.

Russell Community consists of a ten-story residence hall housing approximately 975 students and is divided into four communities: Augusta, Halifax, Stewart, and Savannah. Prior to the openings of Black-Diallo- Miller Hall, East Campus Village Community, and Building 1516, it was UGA's newest residence hall despite having opened in the 1960s. Russell Hall closed for the 2017-2018 academic year to undergo a $44,500,000 renovation and opened 15 months later for the 2018-2019 academic year.

=== Other traditional halls ===
Other than the freshman high-rises, UGA residence halls are located in groups known as communities. Each community is composed of two to seven residence halls.

==== Hill Community ====
Hill Community is made of seven residence halls: Boggs (named after former UGA president William Ellison Boggs, Church (named after former UGA president Alonzo Church, Hill (named after former UGA president Walter Barnard Hill), Lipscomb (named after Andrew A. Lipscomb), and Mell (named after former UGA president Patrick Hues Mell) halls, Morris, and Oglethorpe House (named after the founder of the colony of Georgia, James Oglethorpe). Hill Community is on West Campus, between the freshman high-rises and Bolton Dining Commons to the west, and the main part of the UGA campus to the east. Morris Hall is located on Lumpkin Street near Baxter Street.

Boggs, Church, Hill, Lipscomb and Mell Halls, collectively known as the "lower five", were built in the 1960s and are all four stories, collectively approximately 800 students. Hill Hall houses the University's freshman all-female dorm, with the other buildings of Hill Community being co-ed. The Oglethorpe House, nicknamed "O-House" is nine stories tall and houses residents in suites of two bedrooms and a bathroom. The "O-House" nickname is also applied to the neighboring Oglethorpe Dining Commons despite the lack of "House" in the official name of the dining hall. In January 2024, Oglethorpe House and the neighboring Dining Commons were infested with bats for over a week. As the University worked to remove the bats, the Georgia Department of Public Health encouraged all students living at the dorm as well as visitors and staff to take a survey assessing their exposure to rabies.

==== Myers Community ====
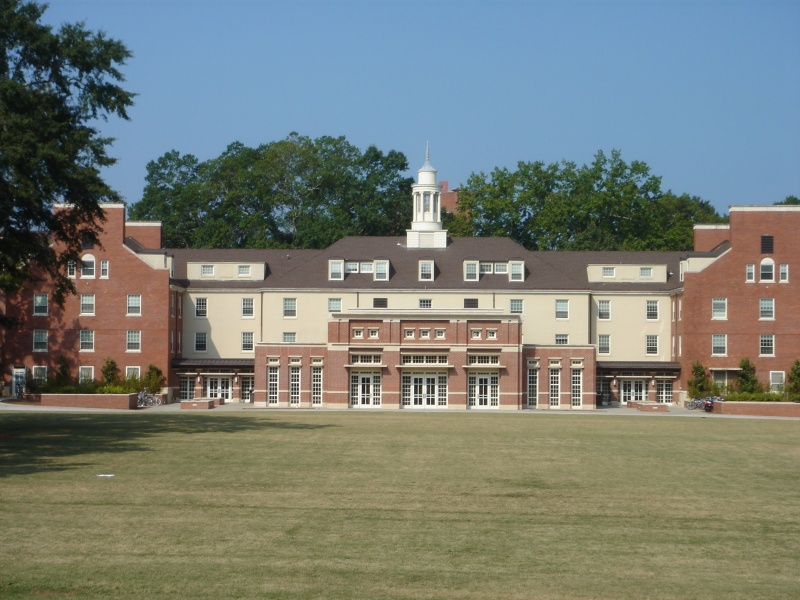
Myers Hall

Myers Community consists of four residence halls: Mary Lyndon (named after Mary Dorothy Lyndon), Myers, Rutherford (named after Mildred Lewis Rutherford), and Soule halls. The Myers Community is located on South Campus. The Myers Quad is the space within the four halls of the community, bound by Myers Hall to the west, Mary Lyndon to the south, Soule to the east (across Sanford Drive), and Rutherford to the north.

Soule Hall is all-female, while the other halls are co-educational. Myers Hall is the primary hall for the Honors Program at UGA. Rutherford Hall contains Franklin Residential College. Collectively, Myers Community houses approximately 850 students.

During home football games, the Myers Quad is often used as a central tailgating location. Although the University of Georgia encourages good tailgating practices, tailgaters are often found leaving the Myers Quad as a mess, disrespecting the property. Tailgating at the University of Georgia, and on the Myers Quad has become like a ritual. Tailgaters often setup close to the dormitories found in the Myers Community. The noise and actions from the tailgaters is often bothersome to the highly academic students who reside in the Myers Community.

This community is also just a short walk to Sanford Stadium, the Tate Student Center, and Stegeman Coliseum.

==== Reed Community ====
Reed Community consists of two residence halls: Reed and Payne halls. Reed and Payne Halls form the main part of Reed Community, and are located immediately north of Sanford Stadium close to Memorial Hall, Tate Student Center and the Zell B. Miller Learning Center(MLC).

==== East Campus Village ====
The East Campus Village (ECV) is made up of four residence halls and collectively houses approximately 1,150 students. It is UGA's newer residential community, having opened in 2004. Residents live in apartments and buildings are co-educational. ECV serves mainly upperclassmen, and is also the designated community for varsity student athletes. Building 1516 is across from Rooker Hall but is not a part of ECV.

The residence halls of ECV are Busbee, McWhorter, Rooker, and Vandiver halls. When ECV opened, most of its buildings were only numbered and not named. Building 1512 was named "Busbee Hall" in 2013 in honor of former governor George Busbee; the other building numbers are 1513 - Rooker, 1514 - Vandiver, and 1515 - McWhorter.

The name McWhorter Hall, prior to ECV's opening, referred to a former residence hall on South Campus, on DW Brooks Drive across from the Driftmier Engineering Center. This residence hall was an all-male dorm housing varsity athletes. The NCAA no longer allows dormitories/residence halls that are exclusive to athletes. This building has since been demolished.

During the summer of 2009, construction began on building 1516 near East Campus Village. The building opened on Monday, Aug. 9, 2010, to more than 550 upperclassmen. The hall has six floors with approximately 550 beds, apartment space, lobby areas, faculty office space and facility shop areas. The structure is a post tension concrete frame with a structural steel framing system for the attic/roof level.

East Campus Village residence halls are completely coeducational, with male and female apartments found throughout all buildings. East Campus Village is located near two parking decks, the Ramsey Student Physical Activities Center, the University Health Center, the Performing and Visual Arts Complex and the dining facility and shops of the new East Village Commons. All four of the halls in East Campus Village are rented to students on an 11-1/2 month basis.

== University Village ==
Nearly undergraduate, graduate and students with families live in one and two-bedroom apartments in one of three on-campus apartment complexes within University Village: University Village, Rogers Road and Brandon Oaks. These three communities are located just south of the main part of South Campus and are accessible from East Campus Road.

== Health Sciences Campus ==
The University of Georgia's Health Sciences Campus, located on Prince Avenue in Athens, is a 56-acre campus that was the former site of the U.S. Navy Supply Corps School, which moved to Rhode Island in 2011 as part of the U.S. Department of Defense Base Realignment and Closure process. UGA's use of the property continues the 120-year history of education on the Navy School site. In 1891, the Georgia State Normal School was incorporated on the property, and in 1932, the school became the Coordinate College of the university for women. In 1953, the Navy acquired the site for use as the Supply Corps School. Currently, students from the Georgia Health Sciences University/University of Georgia Medical Partnership, and graduate students from the College of Public Health reside on the Health Sciences Campus.

Beginning in fall 2013, undergraduate students will have the opportunity to live on the Health Sciences Campus in Brown Hall. The Health Sciences Campus is located in Athens on Prince Avenue and Oglethorpe Avenue near Athens Regional Medical Center and the Normaltown area. The campus is served by university and city bus routes as well as UGA Campus Transit.
