= University of Georgia Graduate School =

Coordinates: 33.95411°N 83.37511°W

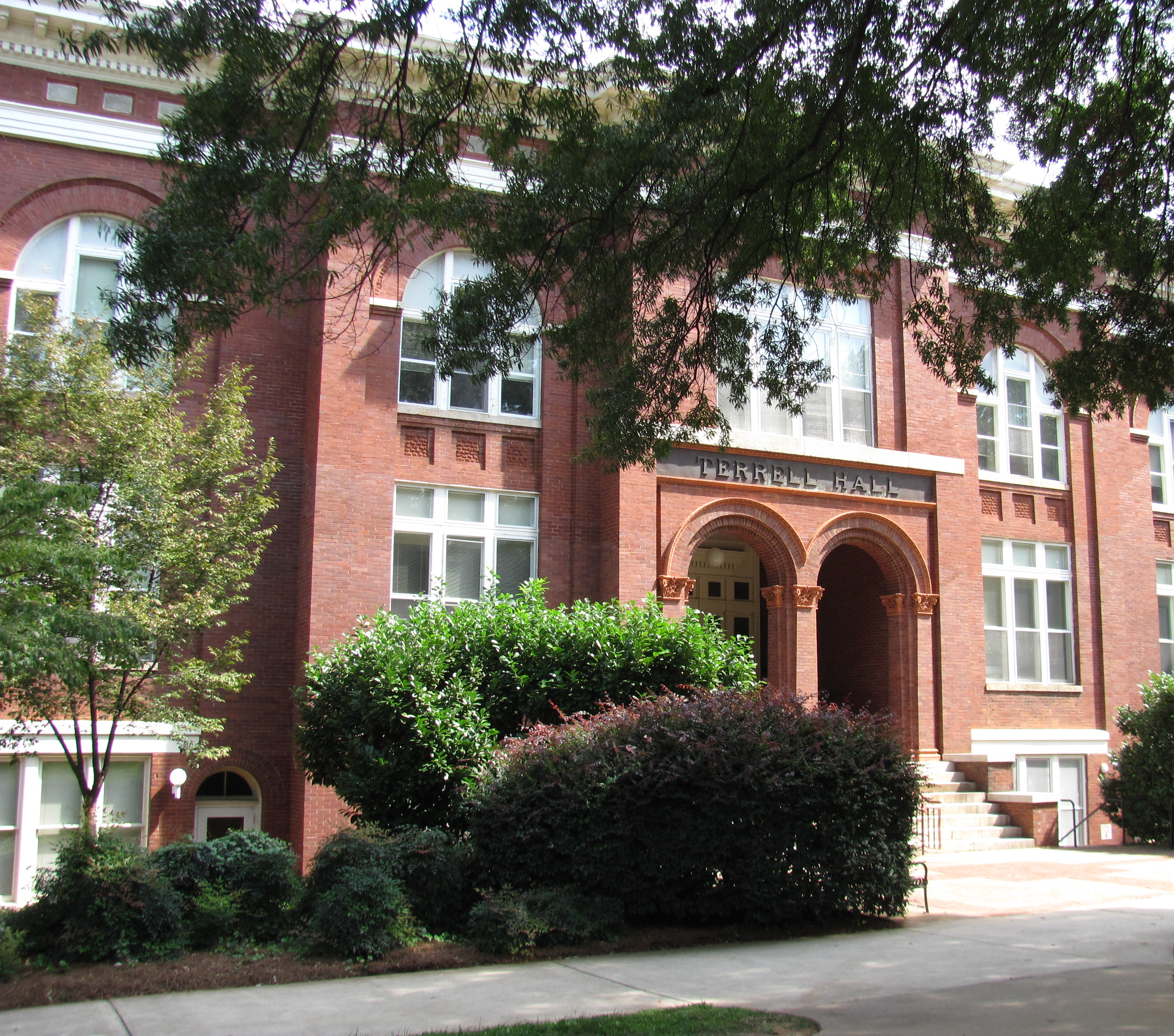
- Type: Public
- Established: 1910
- Dean: Ron Walcott
- Location: Athens, Georgia, United States
- Website: http://grad.uga.edu/

The University of Georgia Graduate School coordinates the graduate programs of all schools and colleges at the University of Georgia in Athens, Georgia, United States. Established in 1910, the University of Georgia Graduate School administers and confers professional, master's and doctoral degrees. The departments under which instruction and research take place are housed in the other schools and colleges at the university.

The University of Georgia Graduate School is responsible for administering and conferring all professional and research master's and doctoral degrees and has conferred 72,664 degrees to date. The school offers advanced degrees in over 130 areas of discipline and has 6,766 students and approximately 1,600 graduate faculty.

The school has received both regional and national awards for excellence in graduate admissions, and has won competitive grants for research initiatives on doctoral completion and minority attrition at the university. Suzanne Barbour currently serves as dean of the graduate school.

== History ==
Founded in 1785, the University of Georgia awarded its first graduate degree, a Master of Arts, nearly a century later in 1870. The first Master of Arts curriculum was put in place in 1868 during the administration of Chancellor Andrew A. Lipscomb, and the first graduate degrees were awarded in 1870 to Washington Dessau, future chancellor Walter Barnard Hill, and Burgess Smith. By 1877, the university's catalog referenced a requirement to take every course offered by the university in order to qualify for the Master of Arts.

In 1872, graduate degree programs in Civil and Mining Engineering were added. The Master of Agriculture was authorized in 1875 with the first student, M.L. Morris earning the first such degree in 1876. The Master of Science followed in 1890. Marion M. Hull earned the first M.S. degree in 1892. Fellowships for graduate studies first appeared in the university catalog in 1891. This description mentioned assistance for providing "certain duties such as tutoring slower students".

Prior to 1910, all post-graduate courses were under the direction of a faculty committee. In 1910, the Board of Regents and Chancellor David Barrow formally established the Graduate School and appointed Willis Henry Bocock as its dean. Seven male students enrolled that fall. It would be nearly a decade later before women gained formal admittance; fifty years for African-Americans. The newly formed Graduate School oversaw 12 fields of study. The Master of Arts alone included philosophy, math, education, history, political science, rhetoric, English literature, German, Latin, Greek, and Romance languages. By 1913, the four degree programs offered included the Master of Arts, Master of Science, Master of Science in agriculture and in civil engineering, and the first formal master's degrees were awarded.

The Master of Science in forestry was authorized in 1917, followed by the Master of Science in economics (later renamed the Master of Science in commerce and eventually the Master of Business Administration) (1923), the Master of Science in home economics (1925), the Master of Arts in education (1930), the Master of Science in chemistry (1932), and the Master of Science in social work (1934). In 1935, the first Doctor of Philosophy degrees in history, biological sciences, and chemistry were offered. The first Ph.D. degrees were conferred in 1940 to Joseph Simeon Jacob (educational psychology) and Horace Montgomery (history). Montgomery went on to author a resolution supporting the university's first minority students and was recognized for his efforts in racially integrating the university.

Additional master's programs (Master of Science in education, Master of Science in agricultural engineering) were established in 1937, and the Master of Fine Arts (with a major in music or visual arts) was created in 1939. Between 1940 and 1975, more than 10 master's degrees, 1 specialist degree, and 5 doctoral degrees were formalized for graduate study.

In 2010, the graduate school celebrated its centennial anniversary. One hundred years after its formal recognition, the Graduate School offered more than 230 graduate programs to over 7,000 enrolled students and conferred 2,271 degrees. Seventy years after conferring the first two Ph.D. degrees, the Graduate School awarded 420 doctoral degrees, nearly half going to women.

== Degree programs ==
As of August 2017, the University of Georgia Graduate School offered 327 graduate degree programs: 115 doctoral, 140 master's, 15 education specialist, 46 interdisciplinary and 11 online degree programs. The Doctor of Philosophy is offered in 86 disciplines, the Master of Arts in 35 disciplines, and the Master of Science in 50 disciplines. Professional doctoral degrees are offered in education, music, and public health, and professional master's degrees are available in 32 areas.

== Rankings and awards ==
Some programs rank within the top 10 according to the U.S. News & World Report 2013 edition of America's Best Graduate Schools.

Other graduate programs to consistently earn high marks from a variety of publications and surveys over the last five years include accounting and both MBA and Executive MBA programs at the Terry College of Business; advertising, public relations, and radio/television in the Grady College of Journalism and Mass Communication; and landscape architecture in the College of Environment and Design.

The National Research Council’s 2010 report identified six University of Georgia doctoral programs that are among the best in the country. From the more than 5,000 doctoral programs ranked in 62 academic fields at 212 participating universities, University of Georgia programs in Food Science, Public Administration, Exercise Science, Forest Resources, Plant Biology, and Mass Communication ranked in the top 25 of their respective fields.

In 2011, the University of Georgia Graduate School was awarded both the Council of Historically Black Graduate Schools/Educational Testing Service Award for Excellence and Innovation in Graduate Admissions for Recruitment through Graduation, and the Conference of Southern Graduate School/Educational Testing Service Award for Excellence and Innovation in Graduate Admissions.
