= Basil Manly Sr. =

American minister (1798–1868)

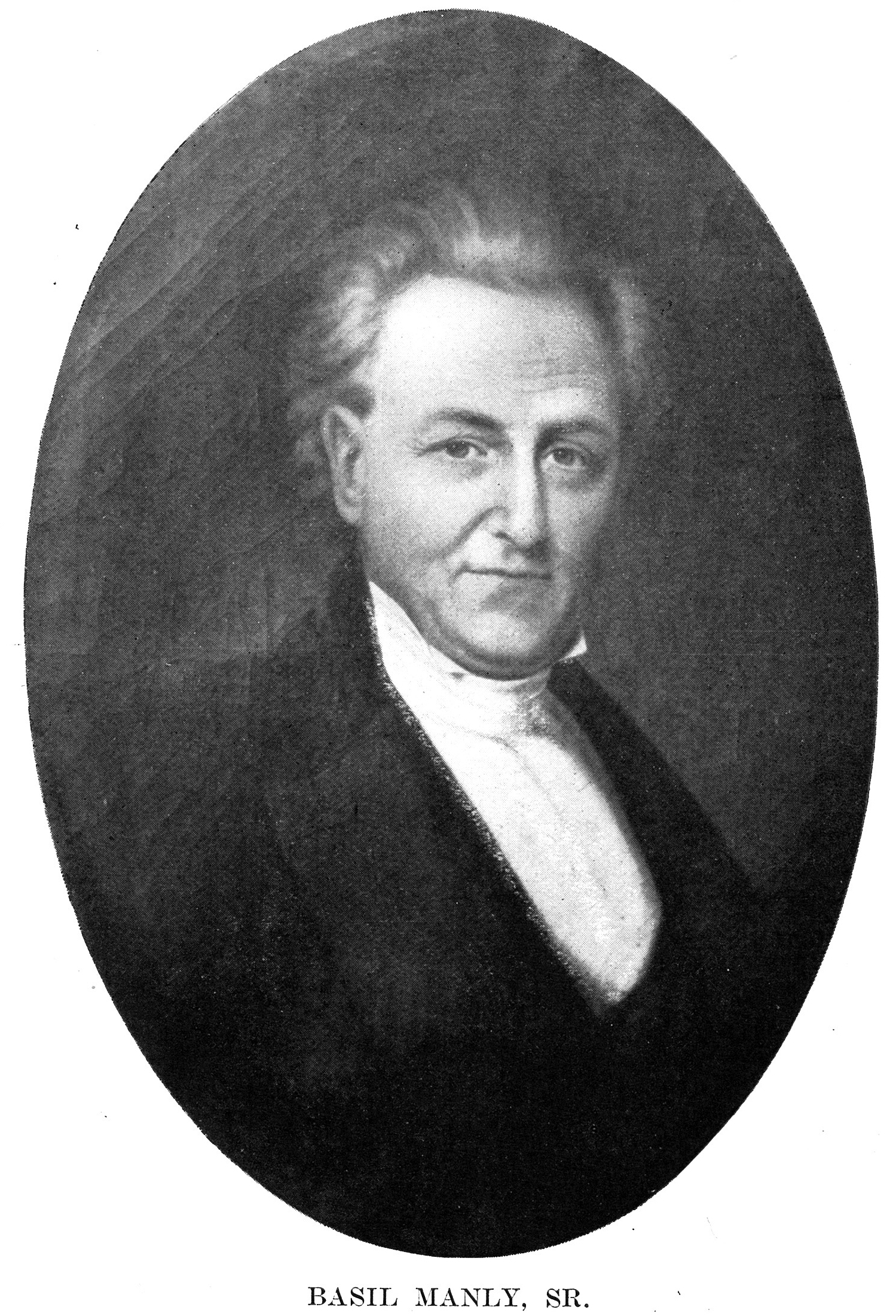
An illustration of Manly

Basil Manly Sr. (January 28, 1798 – December 21, 1868) was an American planter, preacher and chaplain best known as the author of the Alabama Resolutions, which formed part of the argument for creation of the Southern Baptist Convention on proslavery grounds.

== Early life and education ==
Basil Manly Sr. was born near Pittsboro, North Carolina, on January 28, 1798. His parents were Captain John Basil Manly (1742 – 1824) and Elizabeth Maultsby, (1768 – 1855). In 1816, Manly attended the Bingham School, and that same year he was baptized at the Baptist Church of Christ at Rocky Springs, Chatham County, North Carolina.

== Early career as a preacher ==
On April 26, 1818, he received his license to preach from the Baptist Church of Christ at Rocky Springs, North Carolina. He became the beneficiary of the "Southern Education Society", Coosawatchie, South Carolina, on May 17, 1818. The following day, he preached his first regular sermon at the Baptist Meeting House in Beaufort, South Carolina. The following year, in December 1819, he was admitted to the senior class at South Carolina College, Columbia, South Carolina, (later known as the University of South Carolina). Basil graduated valedictorian on December 3, 1821. On March 10, 1822, he was ordained at Little Stevens Creek Church, Edgefield County, South Carolina by Rev. John Landrum and Rev. Enoch Braziel. Manly was elected the pastor of Little Stevens Creek after his ordination and served until 1825. He also pastored Edgefield Village Baptist Church during this time. After the death of Dr. Richard Furman in 1825, Manly replaced Furman as pastor of Charleston Baptist Church in Charleston, South Carolina.

In 1824, he married Sarah Murray Rudolph. Together they had eight children.

On February 22, 1826, he became the minister at Charleston Church, Charleston, South Carolina. Later that year, on May 11, he was officially installed as pastor, where he preached for eleven years. Also in 1826, he helped establish Furman Academy and Theological Institution (later Furman University) at Edgefield, South Carolina.

== Career in Alabama, South Carolina ==
The family moved to Tuscaloosa, Alabama, in 1837, when Manly became president of the University of Alabama, a post he held until 1855. Manly owned 40 slaves and supported the institution of slavery. Throughout his career in Alabama he played a central role in the founding of many institutions and associations. In 1838, he had a leading role in the founding of the Judson Female Institute (which changed its name to Judson College in 1903) in Alabama. In May 1845, he also had a leading role in founding the Southern Baptist Convention. Manly was the chief architect of the split of Southern Baptists from the north over the issue of slavery in the Southern Baptist Convention, and helped create a network of southern ministerial educational institutions in the South as alternatives to those in the North. Then in 1850, he was the founder of the Alabama Historical Society, whose role was to preserve the history of the state.

In 1855, Manly resigned as the president of the University of Alabama, and he accepted a call to preach at the Wentworth Street Baptist Church in Charleston, South Carolina, where he remained for four years. In 1858, he served as founding chairman for the board of trustees of the Southern Baptist Theological Seminary. In 1859, he returned to Tuscaloosa as State Evangelist, and then went to Montgomery, where he took over as pastor for Isaac T. Tichenor at the First Baptist Church. On February 18, 1861, in Montgomery, Alabama, serving as chaplain for the provisional Congress of the Confederate States, Basil commenced the inauguration of Jefferson Davis as the President of the Confederate States of America, with a prayer. He also served at the First Baptist Church in Montgomery, Alabama, in 1861. Then in 1863, he resigned from the First Baptist Church (Montgomery, Alabama), and he returned to Tuscaloosa, Alabama. On November 22, 1864, he was stricken with paralysis. Basil Manly Sr. died at the home of Basil Manly Jr. in Greenville, South Carolina, on December 21, 1868. He was buried at Springwood Cemetery in Greenville.

== Authorship and role in the Confederacy ==
Manly is best known as the author of the Alabama Resolutions, which formed part of the case for creation of the Southern Baptist Convention on proslavery grounds.

Manly played a significant role in the formation of the Confederate States of America. He was elected chaplain to the Alabama Secession Convention in 1861 and delivered its opening prayer, which was published on the front page of the Montgomery Advertiser. He was named official chaplain of the Confederacy, and in his opening prayer he asked for divine protection. He was present for the formation of the Confederate Constitution, and credited with a preamble which invoked "the favor of almighty God." Jefferson Davis chose Manly to deliver the invocation address at his presidential inauguration, and Manly was the only person to accompany Davis and vice president Alexander H. Stephens at the head of the inauguration procession in an open coach.

During the Civil War, Manly was a very visible religious leader. He was often called upon to deliver prayers at public events, wrote in defense of the rebellion, and officiated at hundreds of funerals.

== Views on slavery ==
Manly was one of the most prolific and visible religious voices in support of slavery. He published many treatises in defense of slavery, and frequently engaged northern abolitionists in debate.

Manly's view differed from some other religious leaders, who saw slavery as a pragmatic issue, an unfortunate economic necessity. Instead, in Manly's view, slavery was entirely justified theologically. To Manly, slavery was divinely ordered by God; God himself gave whites the right to own and sell slaves. Manly was known for a series of "Sermons on Duty" which argued that there existed a "divine order" which "naturally lead to different occupations—some to labor, some to plan, and to direct the labor of others." Within that plan, Manly observed, the African "race has been in a state of servitude." Manly taught that if everyone followed their role in the divine hierarchy (meaning white masters on top, and black slaves at the bottom) the system would work to everyone's advantage, and provide rewards not just in this life but for eternity.

In his "Lecture on Ants," Manly compared the relationship of whites and Africans with those species of slave-making ants which "resort to violence to obtain laborers of a different species than their own." In Manly's view, the reason slaves desired freedom was because slave traders captured them too old; they should rather abduct small children and babies who wouldn't have known a life of freedom before capture. Manly explicitly defended such practices as whipping and breaking up families by selling slaves. Manly's view was that since Africans were destined to be slaves anyway under the natural order, enslaved Africans should be grateful to be enslaved by American Christians, because the benevolence of Christianity moderated the cruelty of the institution of slavery.

== Family ==
On December 23, 1824, he married Sarah Murray Rudolph of Edgefield, South Carolina. Sarah Rudolph was born August 1, 1806, and died on September 12, 1894.

Together they had eight children:

- Basil Manly Jr. (December 19, 1825 – January 31, 1892);
- Zebulon Rudolph (July 27, 1827 – July 15, 1829);
- John Waldo (April 8, 1827 – November 6, 1830);
- Sarah Rudolph (Smith) (January 10, 1833 – January 9, 1900);
- Charles (May 28, 1837 – May 1, 1924);
- Abby Murray (Gwathney) (September 12, 1839 – 1919);
- James Syng (October 4, 1842 – March 1, 1921);
- Richard Fuller (February 11, 1845 – August 15, 1919)

== Bibliography ==
- Manly, Basil (1837). Mercy and Judgment: A Discourse, Containing Some Fragments of the History of the Baptist Church in Charleston, S.C. Knowles, Vose and Co.
- Basil Manly (1852). Report on Collegiate Education: Made to the Trustees of the University of Alabama, July 1852. Tuskaloosa: M.D.J. Slade.
- James Petigru Boyce. Life and Death the Christian's Portion: A Discourse Occasioned by the Funeral Services of the Rev. Basil Manley at Greenville, S.C., Dec. 22, 1868 (New York: Sheldon, 1869).
- A. James Fuller. Chaplain to the Confederacy Basil Manly and Baptist Life in the Old South (Baton Rouge: Louisiana State University Press, 2000). ISBN 0807125768
- Samuel Henderson. Christianity Exemplified: A Memorial Sermon of Rev. Basil Manly Sr. (Atlanta: Franklin Steam, 1870).
- Mrs. Henry Lyon. "Manly, Basil, Sr," in Encyclopedia of Southern Baptists, Vol. 2 (p. 818) Norman Wade Cox, ed. (Nashville: Broadman, 1958). ISBN 0805465111
- Thomas J. Nettles. Southern Baptist Sermons on Sovereignty and Responsibility (Harrisonburg, VA: Gano Books, 1984). ISBN 0873779355
- Thomas Mallory Owen. Dr. Basil Manly, the Founder of the Alabama Historical Society (Montgomery, AL: Alabama Historical Society, 1904).
- James August Pate. Basil Manly and His Administration at the University of Alabama, 1837-1855. Thesis (M.A.), University of Alabama, 1955.
- Manly Family papers, W.S. Hoole Special Collections Library, The University of Alabama.
