= Rea and Lillian Steele North Campus =

Valdosta State University Rea and Lillian Steele North Campus
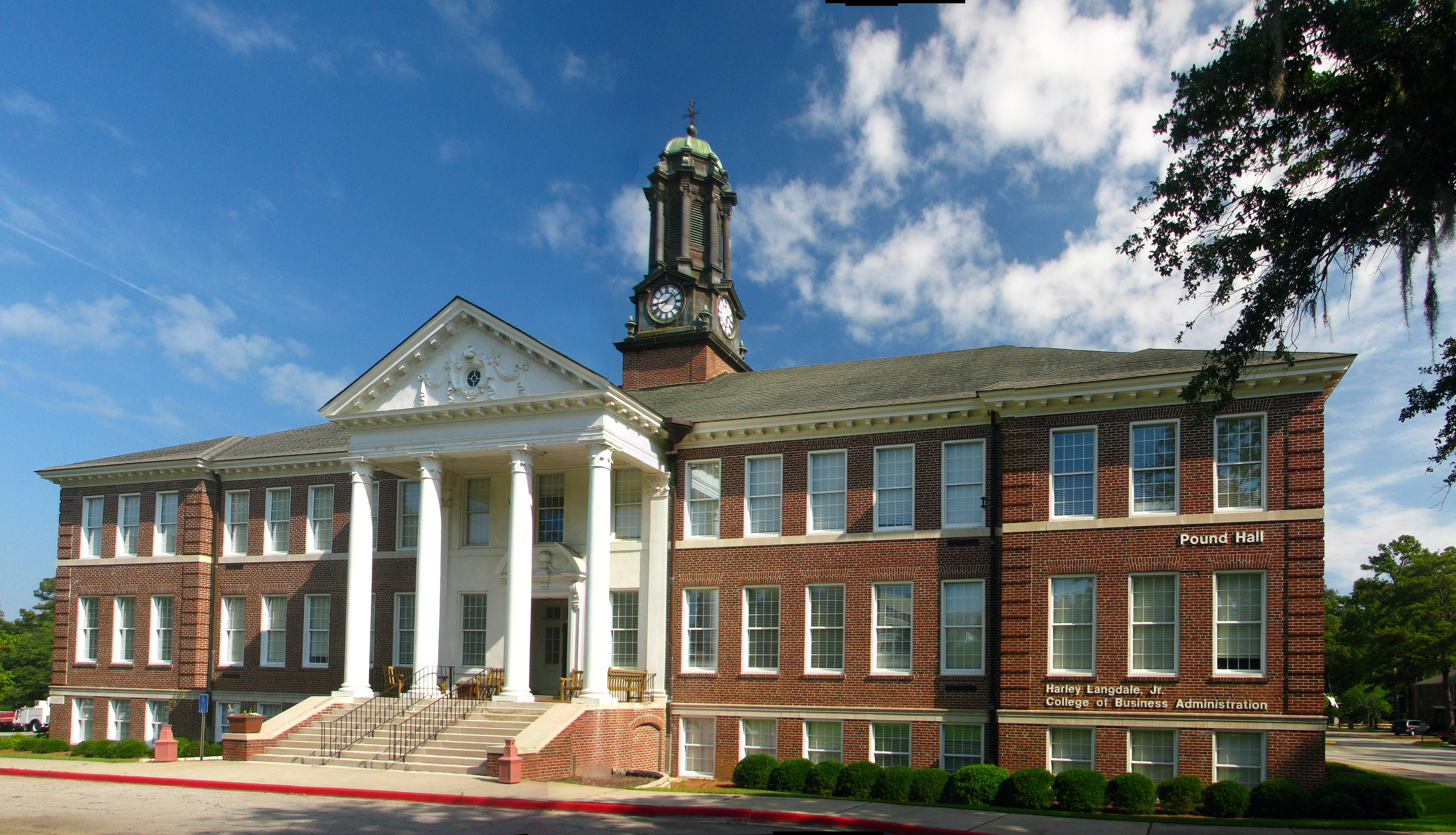
- Pound Hall on the North Campus of VSU
- Established: 1928
- Location: Valdosta, Georgia, USA
- Campus: 43 acres (0.17 km^{2})
- Website: North Campus Website

The Rea and Lillian Steele North Campus is located less than a mile north of the Valdosta State University, Georgia, United States, main campus and is home to the Harley Langdale Jr. School of Business and Air Force ROTC Detachment 172. Billy Grant Field, home of the VSU baseball team, and various recreational fields are also found on the North Campus. The University’s bus service connects the two campuses.

The naming of the north campus came after the Harley Langdale, Jr. College of Business Administration received over $8 million bequest from the estate of Ms. Lillian S. Steele honoring her husband, Mr. Rea Steele, in August 2002.

== History ==
=== Emory Junior College at Valdosta ===
The 40-acre (160,000 m^{2}) north campus of VSU was the former home of Emory Junior College, a two-year institution which opened in 1928. Enrollment was low in the 1930s during the Great Depression and the United States entry into World War II depleted the school's enrollment to the point that Emory Junior College had to close during the duration of the War.

The college reopened in 1946 with a notable rise in student population made up of military veterans returning to school under the GI Bill. Except for the short period following World War II the school again experienced low attendance numbers, averaging less than 70 students throughout its existence. In 1953 Emory Junior College was closed and the property was sold to Valdosta State College, a public institution that became coeducational in 1950.

=== Valdosta State ===
The three remaining buildings of the former Emory Junior College have each served multiple purposes before becoming the Harley Langdale, Jr. College of Business and Division of Aerospace Studies.

- Thaxton Hall originally a male dormitory, was remodeled in 1972 for the Nursing Department. It was remodeled again in 1982 for the College of Business offices. It is named for Dr. J. Ralph Thaxton, the fourth President of the Valdosta State.
- Pound Hall was named for Dr. Jere M. Pound, Valdosta State's second president. It was used for the College of Education and Psychology in the past. It was remodeled in 1974 to house the School of Business Administration. The building was completely renovated in 1992.
- Barrow Hall was named for the David C. Barrow, Chancellor of the University System when South Georgia Normal College opened in 1913. It was remodeled from a male Dormitory in 1971 to house the Division of Aerospace Studies and Air Force ROTC.

== Athletic Facilities ==
The Blazer baseball team plays at Billy Grant Field located on the Valdosta State North Campus. The complex includes the baseball field house, which opened in the spring of 1997, and an indoor batting and pitching building for baseball and softball. The Softball field is located adjacent to Billy Grant Field and opened in the fall of 1999. A new Softball Field house was opened in 2007.

== Future Expansion ==
Close proximity of the campus to South Georgia Medical Center, the largest healthcare facility in the region, and similar interests between VSU and SGMC have led to a cooperative mission to foster a new health sciences program, which would be housed in the near future on the southeast side of North Campus.

The 'Medical Park' would be home to academic programs such as Nursing, Communication Disorders, Social Work, Sports Medicine/ Athletic Training, Exercise Physiology, and Business Administration. The complete project would include a 182,000-square-foot (16,900 m^{2}) facility containing 3 auditoriums, 27 classrooms, 4 computer labs, 44 computer classrooms, and 6 multipurpose and conference rooms. The North Campus expansion also anticipates future plans for another $30 million of construction for residence halls and dining facilities.

In 2004 the $46 million project was placed on the University System of Georgia capital project list. In June 2008 South Georgia Medical pledged over $1 million in support of the development of VSU's anticipated Health Science and Business Administration Facility. The Board of Regents approved this project in 2010 and construction was anticipated to begin in January 2011 and be completed by the Summer of 2012, but was put off by state budget cuts. In 2011 VSU received approximately $400,000 from the U.S. Department of Health and Human Services for initial planning and $2.8 million for architectural design from the Georgia Legislature. The project received a large portion of the remainder of funding from the Georgia Fiscal Year 2013 budget.

On April 30, 2012 VSU held a community celebration for the Health Sciences and Business Administration building on the lawn of North Campus that included guests such as Georgia State Sen. Tim Golden, Georgia Lt. Gov. Casey Cagle, Valdosta Mayor John Gayle and Georgia state Reps. Amy Carter, Jason Shaw, and Ellis Black. On October 4, 2012 an official groundbreaking, presided over by new university President William McKinney and featuring many of the guest from the previous event, was held at the site of the new facility to be completed by January 2014.

When completed VSU will be the only university in the state that has a major hospital facility directly across from the health science education facility. The new structure will consolidate several colleges into one facility and allow for the expansion of the College of Nursing and other health programs. Economic projections show an impact of approximately $60 million in construction and each additional student is estimated to bring in $17,500 to the community. The expansion will create 1,190 jobs throughout the construction period.

=== Ashley Cinema ===
In 2012 another addition to North Campus included the Ashley Cinema property on the north side of the college. The theater land adds 20 percent more usable space and the current facility can hold more than 1,450 people with seating for about 800. The property was purchased for $2 million by the University System Board of Regents. The Ashley Cinema property is being leased back to the occupant until VSU can utilize it. Currently Valdosta State is utilizing the more than 270 parking spaces for student parking on the north campus. Though there are no tentative plans for the property it serves as space for potential growth.
