= Nathaniel Macon Crawford =

American educator (1811–1871)

Nathaniel Macon Crawford D.D.
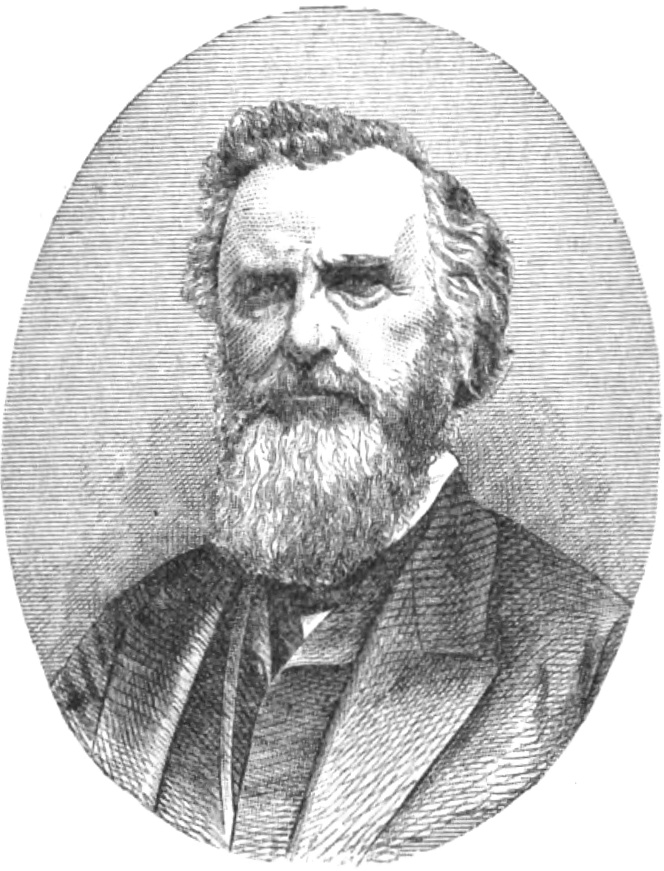

8th President of Georgetown College
- In office 1865–1871
- Preceded by: Duncan Robertson Campbell
- Succeeded by: Basil Manly Jr.

5th President of Mercer University
- In office 1858–1866
- Preceded by: Shelton Palmer Sanford (acting)
- Succeeded by: Henry Holcombe Tucker
- In office 1854–1856
- Preceded by: John L. Dagg
- Succeeded by: Shelton Palmer Sanford (acting)

Personal details
- Born: March 22, 1811 Woodlawn, near Lexington, Georgia, United States
- Died: October 27, 1871 (aged 60) Tunnel Hill, Georgia, United States
- Spouse: Annie Lozeer (m. 1841)
- Children: 4
- Parent(s): William H. Crawford; Susanna Gerardine

Nathaniel Macon Crawford (March 22, 1811 – October 27, 1871) was an American educator who served two non-consecutive terms as the fifth President of Mercer University and then as eighth President of Georgetown College.

== Early life and education ==
Crawford was born on March 22, 1811 in the Crawford homestead called Woodlawn, near Lexington, Georgia, to politician William H. Crawford and Susanna Gerardine. He was named after his father's friend, Nathaniel Macon. His family lived in Washington, D.C. while his father was working as a U.S. Senator. When he was fourteen years old, he and his family returned to Woodlawn.

When he was 15 years old, he entered sophomore in Franklin College (now the University of Georgia) and graduated with highest honors in 1829. He studied law under his father was admitted to the Georgia bar but never practiced law.

== Career ==
Crawford first worked as a clerk in the executive department at Milledgeville, Georgia, under Governor George R. Gilmer's administration. During his job in the office, he was then chosen to be the Professor of Mathematics in Oglethorpe University from 1837 until 1841.

Although Crawford was raised a Presbyterian, he converted into the Baptist Church on the birth of their firstborn because his wife was a Baptist. He was licensed to preach in 1843 and ordained a minister in 1844. He subsequently worked as a pastor in the First Baptist Church in Washington, Georgia in 1845. He was then called in 1846 at the First Baptist Church in Charleston, South Carolina.

Afterwards, he filled as Chairman of Biblical Literature in Mercer University from 1847 until 1854, where he would become President of the University in 1854. Two years later, he left Mercer and became a Chairman of Moral and Mental Philosophy at the University of Mississippi for about one year and then accepted the role of Professor of Theology at the Georgetown College in Kentucky, of which he served for about one year as well.

Crawford published a work titled Christian Paradoxes in 1857, which was said to have been favorably received. Crawford then returned to Mercer and became President again from 1858 to 1866, serving in the institution during the American Civil War.

Upon the death of Duncan R. Campbell in 1865, Crawford filled the role of President of Georgetown College in Kentucky of which he served until 1871, where he resigned to live in his farm in Tunnel Hill, Georgia due to failing health.

Crawford died in October 27, 1871, in Tunnel Hill, Georgia.

== Personal life ==
Crawford was born a Presbyterian, as was his mother, but converted to the Baptist Church when his wife, Annie Lozeer, a Baptist, gave birth to their firstborn child. They married in 1841, and had 4 children together.
