= Jonathan Haralson =

American judge (1830–1912)

Jonathan Haralson (October 18, 1830 – July 11, 1912) was an Associate Justice on the Supreme Court of Alabama and president of the Southern Baptist Convention.

== Biography ==
Haralson received A.B. and A.M. degrees from the University of Alabama in 1851 and 1854. He received an LL.B. from the University of Louisiana in 1853.

Haralson married Mattie Ellen Thompson in 1859, and in 1869, he married Lida J. McFaden. He had three children.

During the American Civil War, Haralson was an agent of the Nitre and Mining Bureau of the Confederate States. One of his slaves, Jeremiah Haralson, later became a member of the Unitef States House of Representatives.

Haralson worked as a lawyer in Selma, Alabama. Alabama Governor George Smith Houston appointed him Judge of the City Court of Selma in 1876. He was elected Associate Justice of the Alabama Supreme Court in 1892 and was re-elected to this position until his retirement in 1908.

Haralson was a trustee of Howard College (later renamed Samford University), Dallas Academy, and the Agricultural and Mechanical College of Alabama. He was a Democrat and a Baptist, serving as president of the Southern Baptist Convention from 1889 to 1898. He is buried at Live Oak Cemetery (Old Live Oak Cemetery) in Selma, Dallas County, Alabama.

== Civil War era poem ==
Haralson's efforts to collect supplies for the Confederate Army are commemorated in a poem.

John Haralson, John Haralson—you are a wretched creature;
You’ve added to this bloody war a new and useful feature.
You’d have us think, while every man is bound to be a fighter,
The Ladies, bless the pretty dears, should save their pee for nitre.

John Haralson, John Haralson, where did you get the notion,
To send the barrel ‘round to gather up the lotion?
We thought the girls had work enough to making shirts and kissing,
But you have put the pretty dears to Patriotic Pissing.

John Haralson, John Haralson, pray do invent a neater,
And somewhat less immodest way of making your saltpetre.
For ‘tis an awful idea, John, gunpowdery and cranky
That when a lady lifts her skirts, she’s killing off a Yankee.

== See also ==
- List of Southern Baptist Convention affiliated people
- Southern Baptist Convention
- Southern Baptist Convention Presidents

Preceded by James P. Boyce	President of the Southern Baptist Convention; 1889–1898	Succeeded by William J. Northen
