= Basil Manly Jr. =

American religious leader and educator (1825–1892)

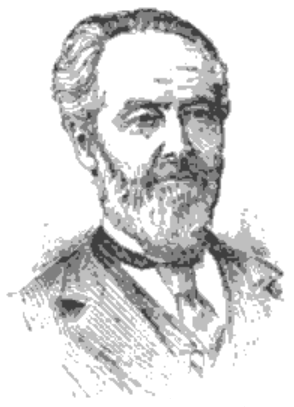
- Born: December 19, 1825; Edgefield County, South Carolina, U.S.
- Died: January 31, 1892 (aged 66); Louisville, Kentucky, U.S.
- Resting place: Cave Hill Cemetery; Louisville, Kentucky, U.S.
- Education: University of Alabama; Princeton Theological Seminary
- Occupation: Clergyman
- Spouses: Charlotte Whitfield Smith (m. 1852) Harriet Summers Hair (m. 1869)
- Father: Basil Manly Sr.

Basil Manly Jr. (December 19, 1825 – January 31, 1892) was an American Baptist minister and educator. He was one of a group of theologians instrumental in the formation of the Southern Baptist Theological Seminary in South Carolina.

== Early life and education ==
Basil Manly Jr. was born December 19, 1825, in Edgefield District, South Carolina to Basil Manly Sr. (1798–1868), a prominent Baptist preacher and educator. He and his family moved to Tuscaloosa, Alabama, when Manly Jr. was 12 years old, as his father was president of the University of Alabama (1837–1855) for nearly 20 years. He grew up in a planter's family; his father enslaved 40 people. In Tuscaloosa, Manly Jr. was baptized at age 14 after reading a biography of Jonathan Edwards. He graduated from the University of Alabama in 1843.

He was licensed by the Baptist church to preach the gospel at age nineteen. He enrolled at Newton Theological Institution in Massachusetts. In 1845 after the Southern Baptist Convention was formed, Manly Jr. transferred to Princeton Theological Seminary.

His father had drafted the "Alabama Resolutions", which formed part of the case for separation of the convention from northern churches. The Newton seminary was affiliated with the rival Northern Baptist Convention at a time of deepening sectional strife prior to the American Civil War.

Manly graduated from Princeton in 1847. He married Charlotte Whitfield Smith in 1852 and they had two sons and a daughter. He remarried in 1869 to Harriet Summers Hair, and they had one son.

== Career ==
Manly was the pastor of First Baptist Church (Richmond, Virginia) from 1850 to 1854.

With John Albert Broadus, William Williams, and James Petigru Boyce, he was instrumental in the formation of the Southern Baptist Theological Seminary in Greenville, South Carolina. The seminary was central to the formation of the Southern Baptist Convention and its ministers. In 1877 the seminary moved to Louisville, Kentucky. With Broadus, Manley was also one of the first leaders of the Sunday School Board publishing operations.

Manly was president of Georgetown College from 1871 to 1879.

Basil Manly Jr. died at his home in Louisville on January 31, 1892. He was buried at Cave Hill Cemetery.

== Works ==
- The Bible Doctrine of Inspiration, Explained and Vindicated. New York: A.C. Armstrong. 1891.
- Basil Manly Sr.; Basil Manly Jr. (1870). The Baptist Psalmody: A Selection of Hymns for the Worship of God. Atlanta: Sheldon & Connor.
