= Willis Henry Bocock =

Willis Henry Bocock (January 4, 1865, in Halifax, Virginia –1947) was a prominent administrator and professor of classics at the University of Georgia. One of the highlights of his career was his appointment as the first Dean of the newly formed University of Georgia Graduate School in 1910. Much of the present success of graduate programs at the University of Georgia can be traced to his visionary leadership. Throughout his career, Bocock maintained a reputation for excellence in scholarship and leadership. Bocock was, as were many members of the first graduate faculty, a Virginian. He was born in 1865, the son of a prominent Presbyterian clergyman. He attended school in Lexington, Virginia, and at the Kemper School (later Kemper Military School) in Boonville, Missouri. Bocock entered Hampden-Sydney College in 1881. He graduated in 1884 with the degrees of Bachelor of Arts and Bachelor of Letters. After his graduation from Hampden-Sydney he spent a year at the University of Virginia and obtained diplomas in Latin and Greek. Bocock was a recipient of the now extinct Master of Arts degree from Hampden-Sydney.

Bocock spent the year after he left the University of Virginia in Richmond as a school teacher. He was offered the position of professor of Greek at Hampden-Sydney in 1886, a position which he gleefully accepted. Hampden-Sydney president J. D. Eggleston wrote of Bocock: “I doubt whether Hampden-Sydney has ever had a more brilliant teacher than W. H. Bocock. He was elected full professor when he was twenty-one.” Bocock also attended the University of Berlin in the period 1892-93 and traveled throughout Europe. He was offered the chair of Professor of Ancient Languages at the University of Georgia in 1889. In 1894 separate professorships of Greek and Latin were created. Bocock assumed the professorship of Greek and William Davis Hooper, another Hampden-Sydney graduate, assumed that of Latin.

With the formation of the University of Georgia Graduate School in 1910, and Bocock's appointment as dean, he assumed demanding administrative duties as well as maintaining excellence in teaching. Bocock's career illustrates the problem with the lack of publications by nineteenth and early twentieth century faculty. Bocock was a talented and assiduous researcher, what he did not have is free time to compile his research. Thomas Walter Reed comments about this problem: ". . . that the inability of the University of Georgia and other Southern institutions to provide enough members of their faculties to make it possible for some members to have time in which to prepare and publish articles and books of great value, has resulted in a loss to American literature of many valuable contributions." This is certainly true of Bocock, although he made regular contributions to journals such as: Studies in Philology, Classical Review, and American Journal of Philology, he was never able to publish any extended work.

Bocock developed an interest in international relations as a result of World War I. He was named Lecturer on International Relations by the University of Georgia Board of Trustees in 1931 and was a popular and prolific speaker on this subject. Bocock served as Dean of the Graduate School for eighteen years. In his tenure enrollment rose from twenty-four graduate students in 1913 to over two hundred in 1928. He stepped down in 1928, at the age of sixty-three, because he felt it was time for a younger man to assume the leadership role. He was succeeded by Roswell Powell Stephens of the Mathematics Department. Bocock continued teaching and at his retirement in 1945, had served the University of Georgia for fifty-six years. He was noted as an exacting and systematic scholar. It was this outlook that he brought to the systematization of graduate education at the University of Georgia.

Bocock and R. L. McWhorter taught, in 1910, a major graduate course in Greek which consisted of literary selections and exercises in grammar, written and spoken Greek, history, and poetry. The course description points out a problem with early graduate education at the University of Georgia that was common with many other institutions: “studied from sources so far as the library resources of the University permit.” Bocock also taught, by himself, “An Introduction to New Testament Greek.” These classes were in addition to undergraduate teaching and his duties as Dean. The New Testament Greek class was not offered after 1913 and after 1923, Bocock taught the major Greek class by himself. Bocock often decried the declining interest by students in Greek, symptomatic of this is the fact that the 1931-32 Graduate Bulletin notes: “For courses in Greek Literature, consult the professor.”207 After 1931, the Greek Literature class would be transformed into “Introduction of European Literature” which had a prerequisite of three years of college-level Latin. Greek literature was no longer studied in the original language but was now “Greek Literature in Translations.” In a memorial to Bocock in 1948, Robert Preston Brooks wrote: "Mr. Bocock was an altogether charming companion. Few men were so perennially delightful. The depth and variety of his knowledge of literature, ancient and modern, and of world history and contemporary affairs was impressive; and he invariably expressed his views in perfect English. No one was ever bored in his presence." Bocock continued to serve the Graduate School after leaving the deanship. He served as a member of and advisor to the Graduate Council into the 1940s. He retired from the University of Georgia in 1945. Bocock married Bessie Perry Friend of Petersburg, Virginia in 1885. The Bococks had two children: John Holmes Bocock and Natalie Friend Bocock. Bocock died October 31, 1947, in Richmond, Virginia.
