= Walthourville, Georgia =

- City
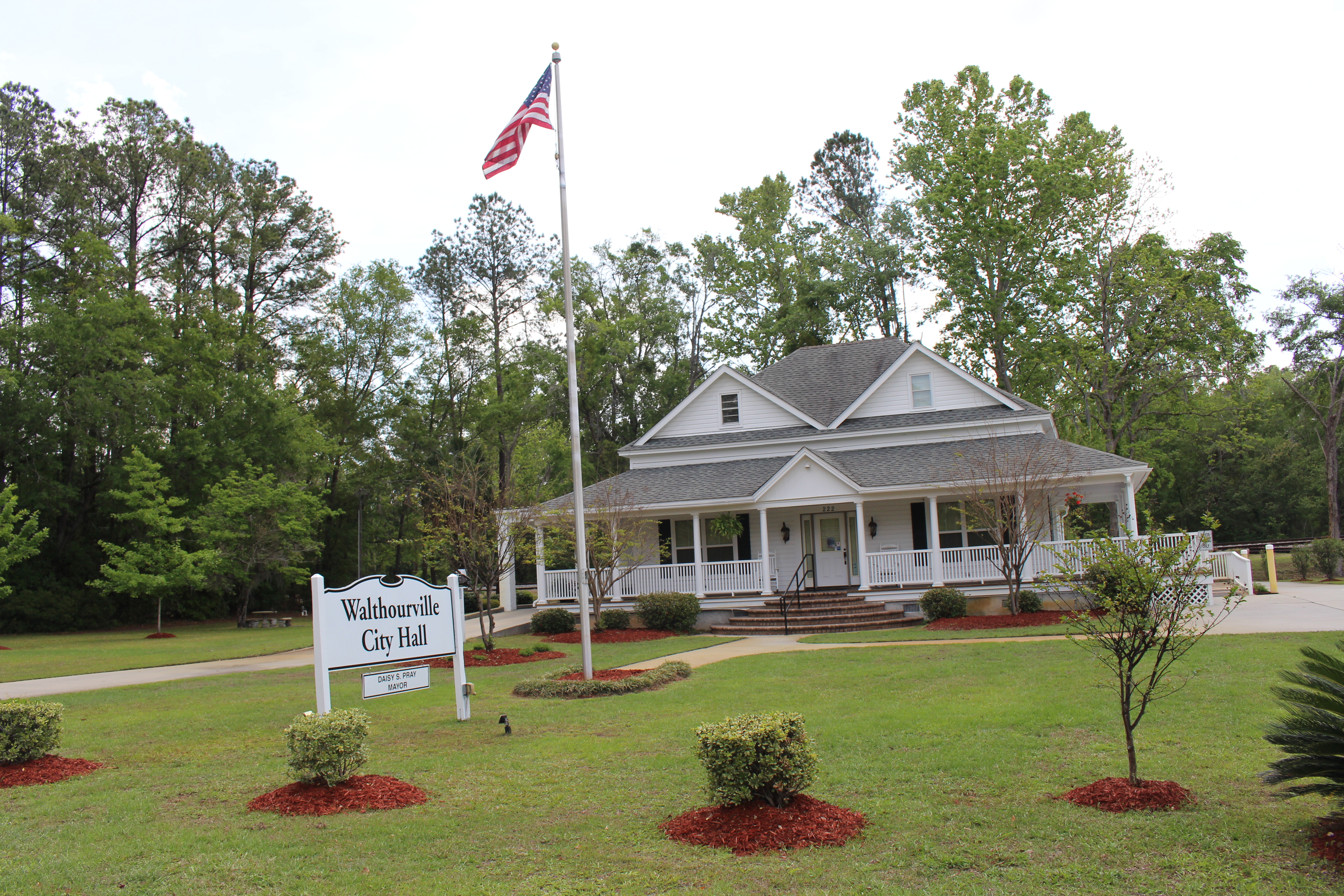
- City hall

- Seal

- Location in Liberty County and the state of Georgia
- Coordinates: 31°46′34″N 81°37′27″W
- Country: United States
- State: Georgia
- County: Liberty

Area
  - Total: 3.85 sq mi (9.96 km^{2})
  - Land: 3.85 sq mi (9.96 km^{2})
  - Water: 0 sq mi (0.00 km^{2})
- Elevation: 89 ft (27 m)

Population (2020)
  - Total: 3,680
  - Density: 957.3/sq mi (369.63/km^{2})
- Time zone: UTC-5 (Eastern (EST))
  - Summer (DST): UTC-4 (EDT)
- ZIP code: 31333
- Area code: 912
- FIPS code: 13-80256
- GNIS feature ID: 0356617
- Website: cityofwalthourville.com

Walthourville (/ˈwɔːltaʊərvɪl/) is a city in Liberty County, Georgia, United States. When it was incorporated in 1974, it had a government entirely composed of women; and in 1978 it elected Carrie Kent, the first African-American woman mayor in Georgia history. Walthourville is a part of the Hinesville-Fort Stewart metropolitan statistical area (MSA). The population was 3,680 at the 2020 Census.

== History ==
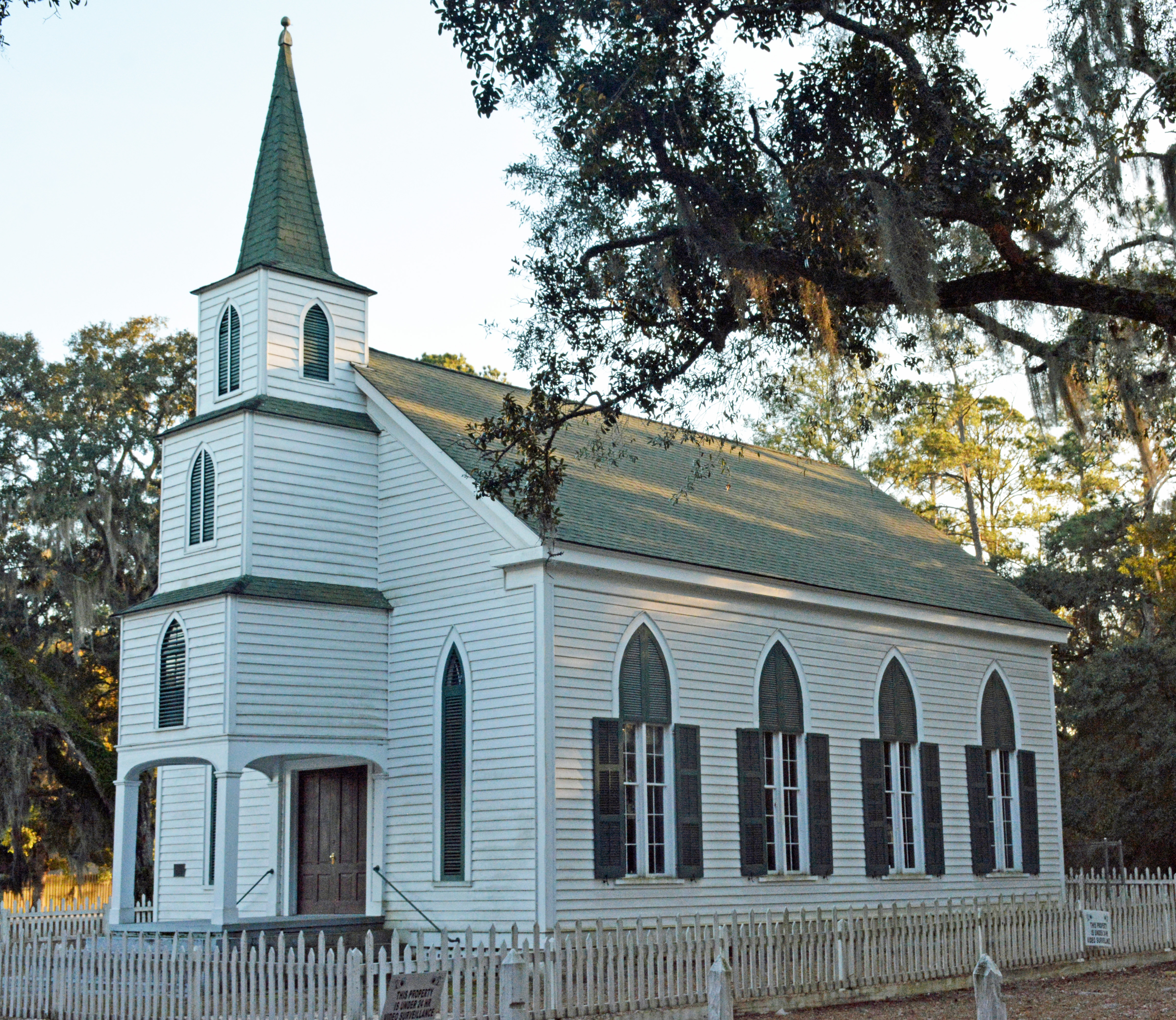
Walthourville Presbyterian Church, National Register of Historic Places

Walthourville draws its name from Andrew Walthour, a revolutionary soldier and a physician who established a plantation in the area circa 1795. The Walthourville Presbyterian Church was originally housed in a structure, erected in 1820, which served as a meeting place for both Baptists and Presbyterians. In 1845 a Presbyterian church was erected, which was destroyed by fire in 1877. The following year a new church was completed, with that structure being destroyed in a storm in 1881. The present church was dedicated in July 1884.

The Walthourville Academy, a non-sectarian co-educational school, was founded in 1823. A post office was established on July 3, 1837

By the 1840s the town was one of the most prosperous towns in south Georgia. In 1854 the North Newport Church moved to Walthourville.

The tracks of the Savannah, Albany & Gulf Railroad reached Walthourville in 1857. The railroad merged with the Atlantic & Gulf Railroad and traversed south Georgia from Savannah to Bainbridge. The Walthourville depot was Station No. 4, the fourth to be constructed on the line from Savannah.

An 1862 guide to Confederate railroads provided the following description of Walthourville, "a post-town in Liberty county, Georgia, forty miles South-west of Savannah, is the largest place in the county. It contains two flourishing academies, and about 400 inhabitants."

By 1974 the town had an airstrip and an industrial park, and there was some concern the area might be annexed by nearby Hinesville, Georgia. Although the town was 179 years old, it was not officially chartered by the state. An attempt to do so by the male leaders of the town some 12 years earlier had failed due in part to "bickering."

A committee entirely composed of women completed the necessary census and circulated a petition as required, getting 300 signatures. When they filed the paperwork with the Georgia General Assembly for approval they named themselves the incorporating officers. "We thought it was all just on paper", said Mayor Lyndol Anderson. But when the approved papers arrived (signed by then-Governor Jimmy Carter) they realized they were required to serve as town government until the first election in December.

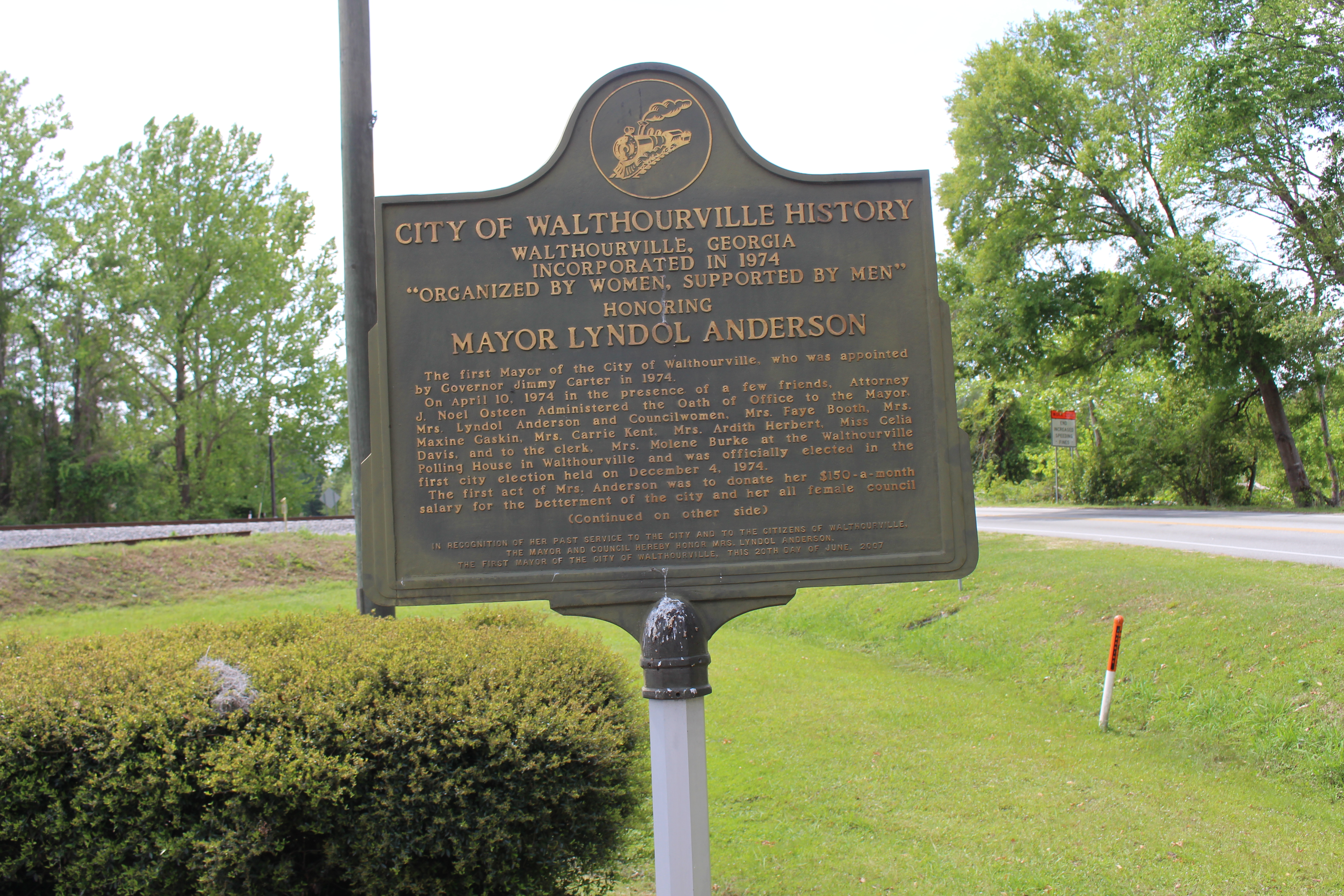
2007 Historical marker

They were sworn into office in April 1974 becoming one of the first all-women governments of a municipality in Georgia history. (The first known instance was Oak Park in 1934). Coming as it did at the height of the women's liberation movement, the all-woman government of the town attracted much attention including national coverage by A.P., UPI, NBC Nightly News with John Chancellor and CBS Evening News with Walter Cronkite. The women of Walthourville, however, reportedly rejected the label of "women's libbers".

In December 1974 the all-woman slate ran in its first election, and were challenged by a slate of male candidates, none of whom succeeded. The women had proven themselves good campaigners as well as good governors. They had gotten streetlights installed in the town and put up street signs, and had not only levied no new taxes, but they had donated their own (nominal) official salaries back to the town.

Four years later, one man did join the council in the 1978 election. In the same election, council member Carrie Kent was elected mayor - the first African-American woman to be elected mayor in Georgia. In 2007 the town erected a historical marker commemorating the history of its incorporation (see photo).

== Points of interest ==
In the vicinity of Walthourville across the county line near the intersection of Tibet Highway and Griffin Road lies Tea Grove Plantation, an outdoor collection of historic buildings, vehicles, and farming equipment open to the public.

Walthourville Presbyterian Church is on the National Register of Historic Places.

== Geography ==
Walthourville is located at 31°46′34″N 81°37′27″W (31.776124, -81.624229).

According to the United States Census Bureau, the city has a total area of 3.8 sq mi (9.8 km^{2}), all land.

== Demographics ==
Historical population
Census	Pop.	Note	%±
1980	905		—
1990	2,024		123.6%
2000	4,030		99.1%
2010	4,111		2.0%
2020	3,680		−10.5%
U.S. Decennial Census; 1850-1870 1870-1880; 1890-1910 1920-1930; 1940 1950 1960; 1970 1980 1990; 2000 2010

=== 2020 census ===
As of the 2020 census, Walthourville had a population of 3,680. The median age was 31.9 years. 27.8% of residents were under the age of 18 and 8.2% of residents were 65 years of age or older. For every 100 females there were 87.4 males, and for every 100 females age 18 and over there were 85.3 males age 18 and over.

98.6% of residents lived in urban areas, while 1.4% lived in rural areas.

There were 1,347 households, including 1,006 families, in Walthourville. Of all households, 39.0% had children under the age of 18 living in them, 40.8% were married-couple households, 19.8% were households with a male householder and no spouse or partner present, and 32.4% were households with a female householder and no spouse or partner present. About 25.1% of all households were made up of individuals and 5.8% had someone living alone who was 65 years of age or older.

There were 1,619 housing units, of which 16.8% were vacant. The homeowner vacancy rate was 1.1% and the rental vacancy rate was 18.3%.

Walthourville racial composition as of 2020
Race	Num.	Perc.
White (non-Hispanic)	879	23.89%
Black or African American (non-Hispanic)	2,103	57.15%
Native American	15	0.41%
Asian	32	0.87%
Pacific Islander	24	0.65%
Other/Mixed	248	6.74%
Hispanic or Latino	379	10.3%

== Government and infrastructure ==
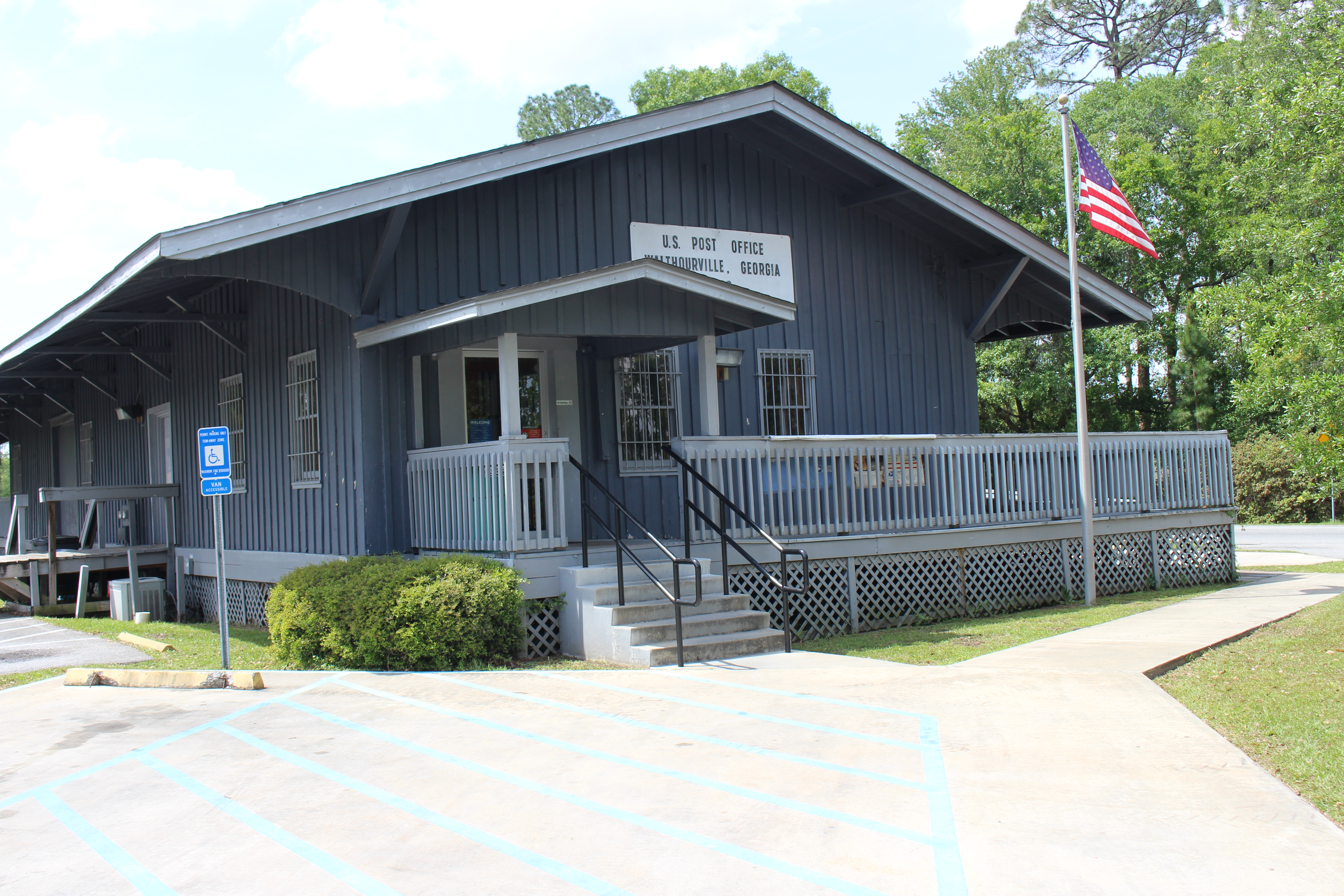
Walthourville Post Office

The United States Postal Service operates the Walthourville Post Office.

== Education ==
The Liberty County School District operates public schools serving Walthourville.

== Notable people ==
- William Bennett Fleming (1803 – 1886), U.S. Representative retired here
- Patrick Hues Mell (1814 – 1888), Southern Baptist Convention President, University of Georgia chancellor
- Robert Walthour (1878 – 1949), World Champion cyclist

== Gallery ==
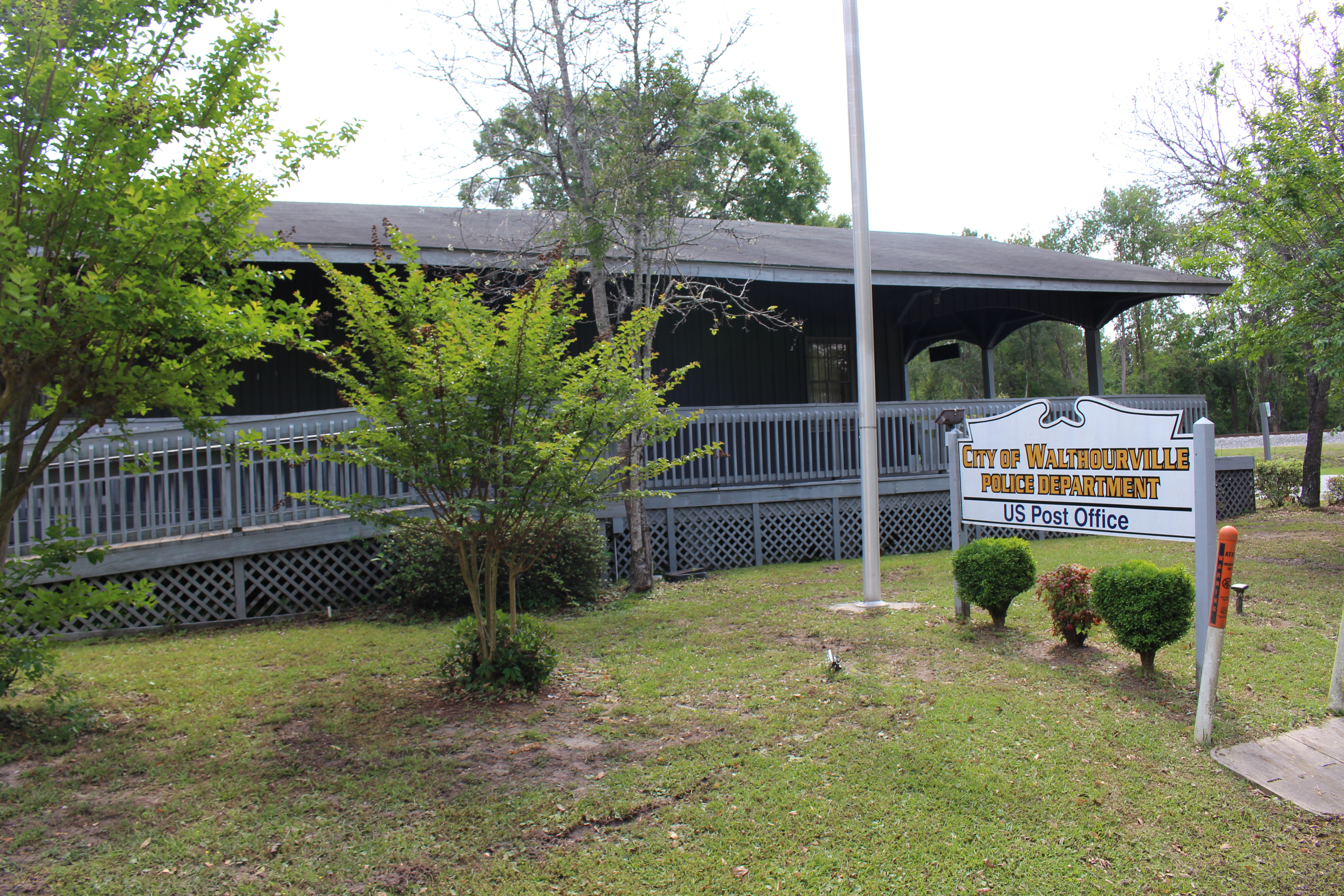
The building housing the police station and the post office

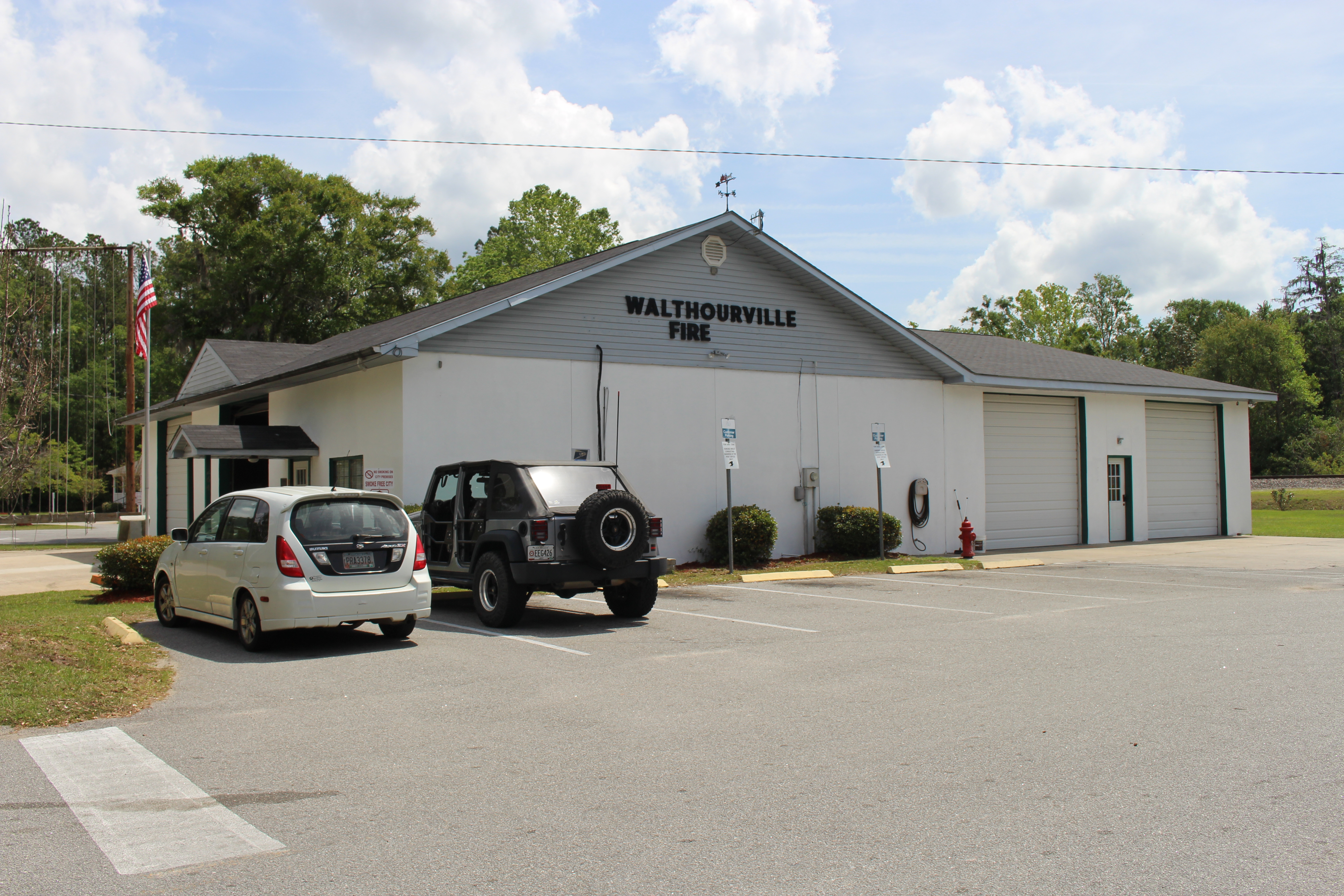
Fire station

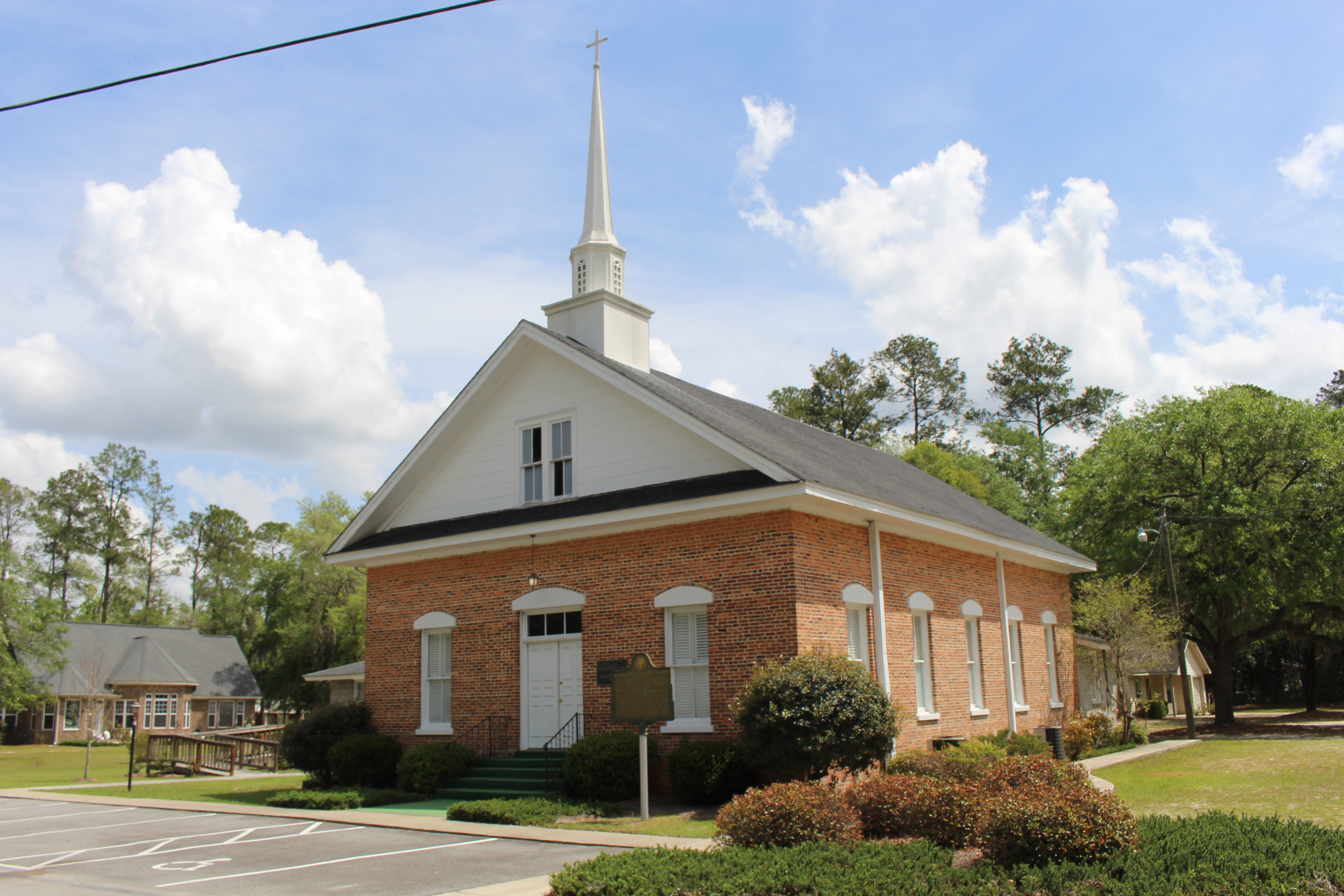
Walthourville Baptist Church

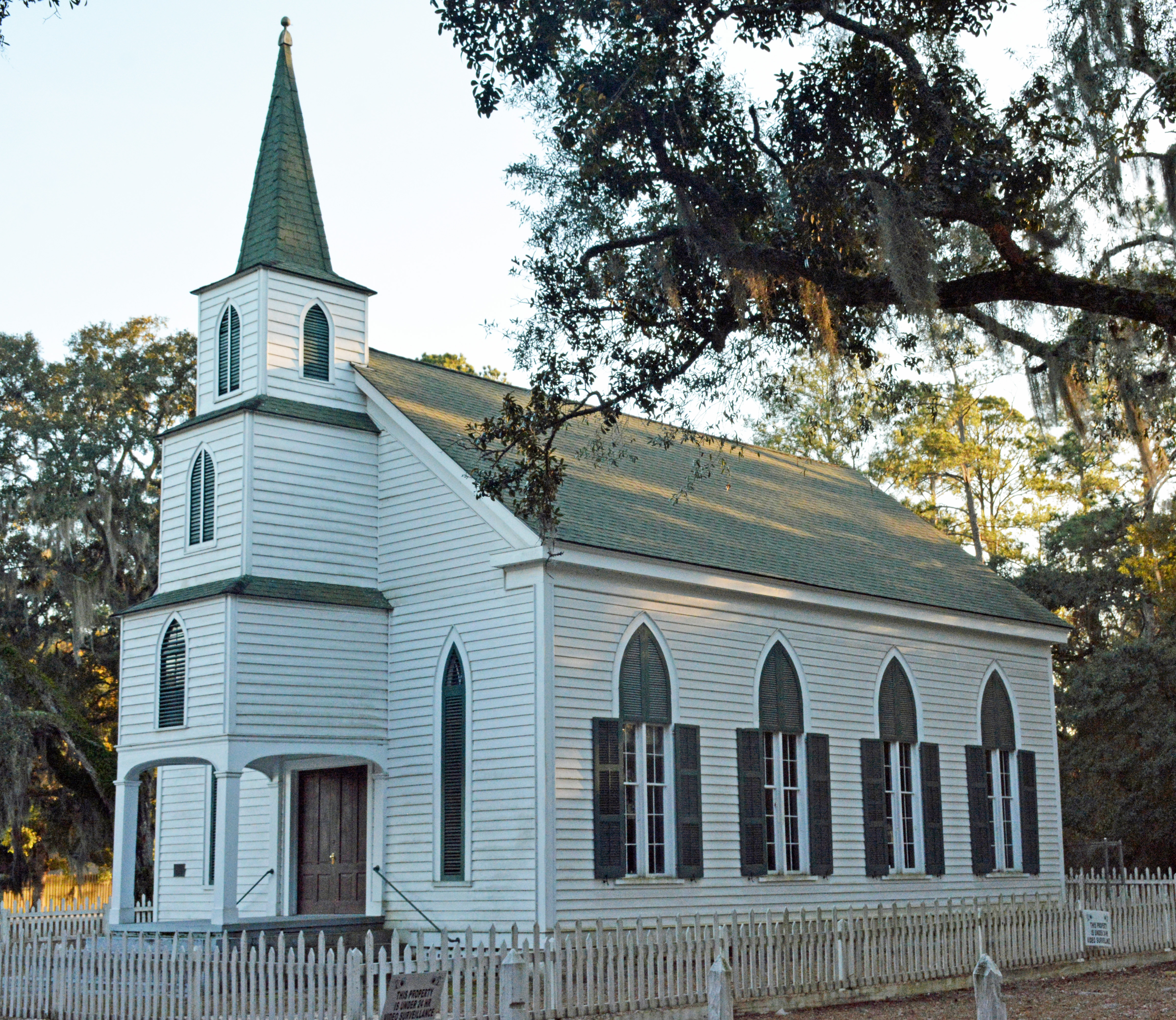
Walthourville Presbyterian Church (on the National Register of Historic Places)
