= Richard Fuller (minister) =

American pastor (1804–1876)

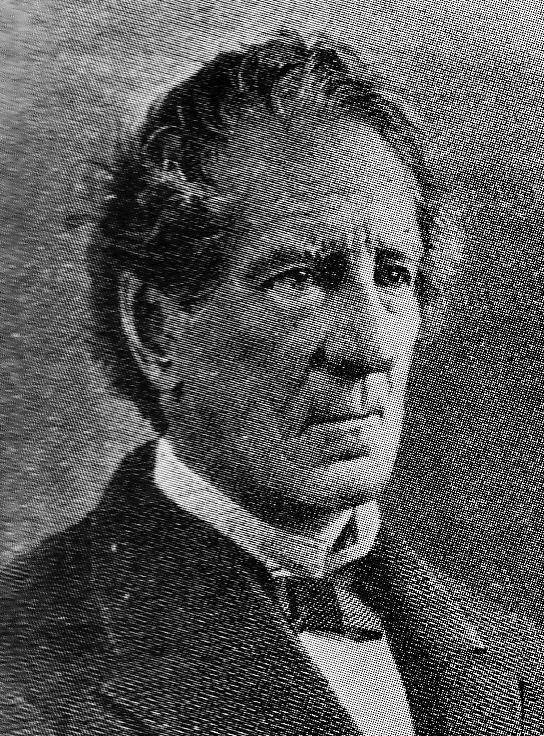
- Born: April 22, 1804; Beaufort, South Carolina, U.S.
- Died: October 20, 1876 (aged 72); Baltimore, Maryland, U.S.
- Resting place: Green Mount Cemetery; Baltimore, Maryland, U.S.
- Education: Harvard University
- Known for: founder of the Southern Baptist movement

Signature
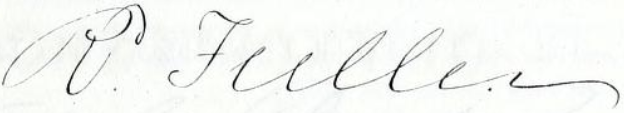

Richard Fuller (April 22, 1804 – October 20, 1876) was an American Baptist minister and one of the founders of the Southern Baptist movement.

== Early life ==
Richard Fuller was born on April 22, 1804, in Beaufort, South Carolina. His great-grandfather William Fuller arrived in Yorktown from Wincanton, South Somerset, England in 1702 and settled in Edgecombe County, North Carolina in the 1720s. His grandfather moved to Beaufort, South Carolina in the 1780s. He received his early instruction from Dr. William T. Brautly. At the age of seventeen, Fuller entered Harvard University in Massachusetts. Despite health problems, he graduated with his class in 1824.

He then studied law in Beaufort, was admitted to the bar, and soon rose to eminence in his profession.

== Career ==
Despite his success, during a period of great religious interest in Beaufort he felt it his duty to abandon the law and devote himself to the Christian ministry. At the same time, he decided to leave the Protestant Episcopal Church in which he had been brought up. He converted to the Baptist Church under the guidance of preacher Daniel Baker during his revival sermons at the Parish Church of St. Helena.

He was at once ordained, and called to the pastorate of the Baptist church at Beaufort. His reputation as a preacher soon became national and his services were widely sought in promoting religious revivals. In preaching, Fuller closely copied the style of French preacher James Saurin. During his residence in Beaufort, he was engaged in two memorable controversies — one with Bishop England of Charleston, on the claims of the Roman Catholic Church, and the other with President Wayland, of Brown University, on the subject of slavery. In 1836 he traveled in Europe for the benefit of his health.

In 1844, Fuller was one of the founders of the Southern Baptist movement, which split from the Northern Baptists over the issue of slavery in the United States, which Fuller and the Southern Baptists refused to oppose. He was more than once president of the Southern Baptist Convention. In 1846, he became pastor of the Seventh Baptist Church in Baltimore, Maryland, where he spent the remainder of his life. He became the pastor of Eutaw Place Baptist Church in 1871 and remained there until his death.

== Writings ==
In addition to pamphlets and various sermons published separately, he was the author of a volume of Sermons, Letters on the Roman Chancery, Correspondence on Domestic Slavery, Argument on Baptist and Close Communion (1849), and Psalmist.

== Personal life ==
Fuller married a wealthy widow whose affairs he attended to as an attorney.

Fuller died on October 20, 1876, at his home at 87 Park Avenue in Baltimore. He was buried at Green Mount Cemetery in Baltimore.

== See also ==
- List of Southern Baptist Convention affiliated people
- Southern Baptist Convention
- Southern Baptist Convention Presidents

Preceded by R. B. C. Howell	President of the Southern Baptist Convention; 1859–1863	Succeeded by Patrick Hues Mell
