= Walthourville Presbyterian Church =

Historic church in Georgia, United States

- U.S. National Register of Historic Places
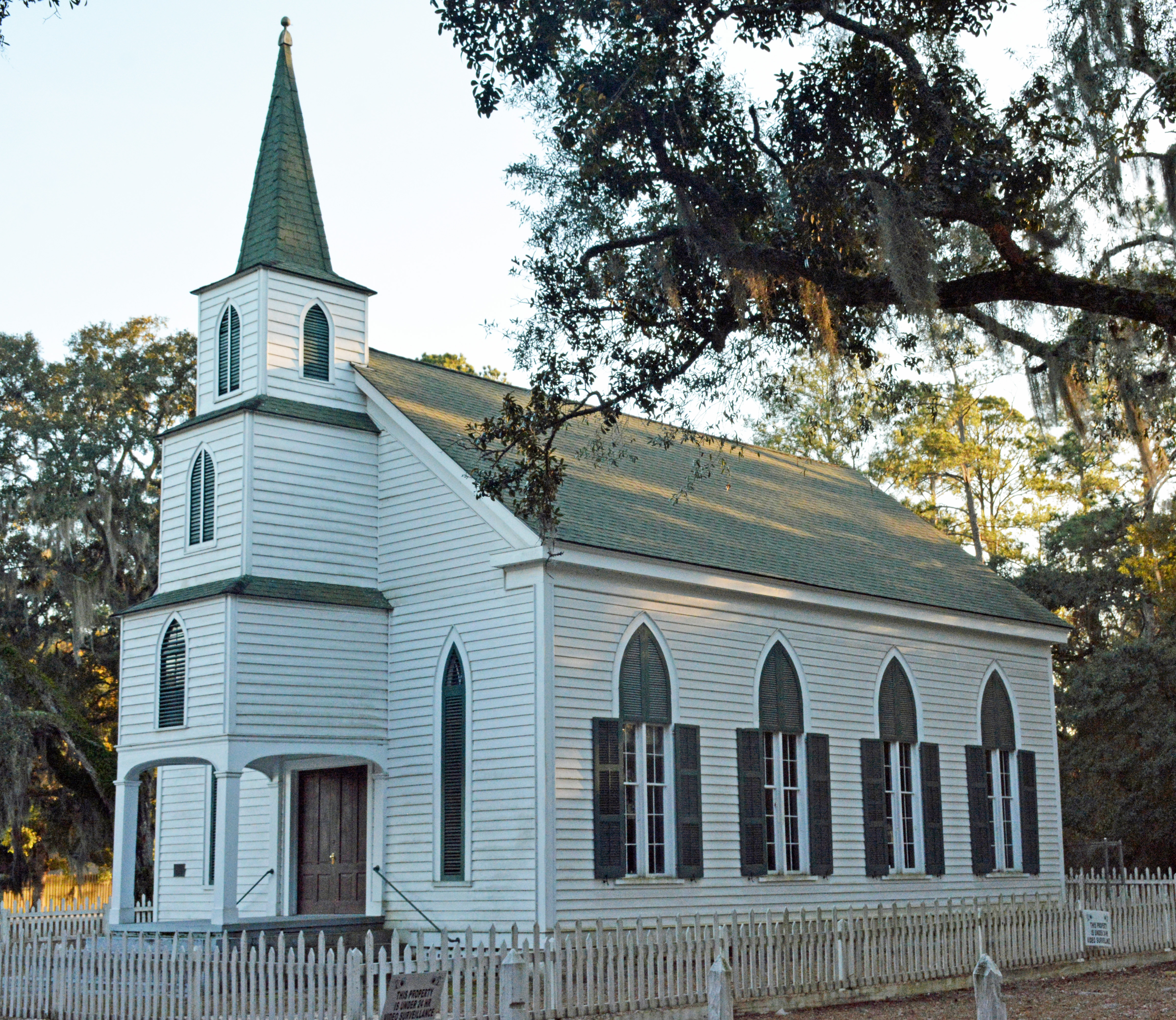

- Location within Georgia Location within the United States
- Location: Allenhurst Antioch Rd., Walthourville, Georgia
- Coordinates: 31.75011°N 81.61387°W
- Area: less than one acre
- Built: 1884
- Architectural style: Gothic
- NRHP reference No.: 87001357
- Added to NRHP: August 6, 1987

Walthourville Presbyterian Church is a historic Presbyterian church on Allenhurst Antioch Road near Walthourville, Georgia, United States. Construction was started in 1884 and is a frame structure in a Gothic Revival style. It replaced a building that was destroyed by a storm in 1881, which itself replaced a building destroyed by fire in 1877. Except for the main entrance, all windows and doors are lancet arched. The interior retains all of its original furniture.

It was added to the National Register of Historic Places in 1987.
