= Henry Holcombe Tucker =

American educator (1819–1889)

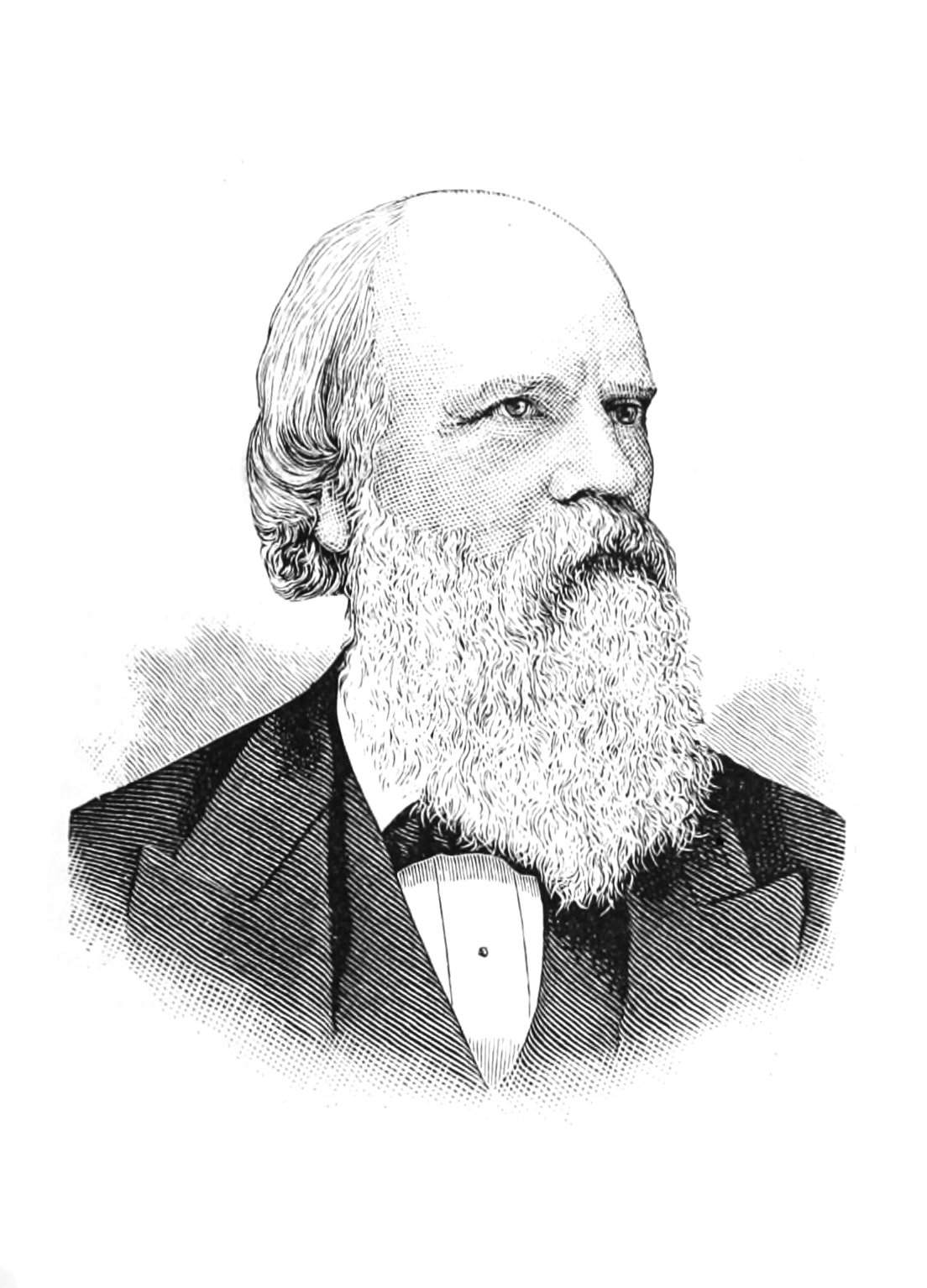

2nd Chancellor of the University of Georgia
- In office 1874–1878
- Preceded by: Andrew A. Lipscomb
- Succeeded by: Patrick H. Mell

5th President of Mercer University
- In office 1866–1871
- Preceded by: Nathaniel Macon Crawford
- Succeeded by: Archibald John Battle

Personal details
- Born: May 10, 1819 near Camak, Georgia
- Died: September 9, 1889 (aged 70) Atlanta, Georgia
- Spouse: Mary C. West (m. 1848, died)
- Education: George Washington University

Henry Holcombe Tucker (May 10, 1819 – September 9, 1889) was the chancellor of the University of Georgia in Athens from 1874 until his resignation in 1878. Tucker also served as president of Mercer University in Macon, Georgia, from 1866 to 1871.

== Early life ==
Tucker was born on May 10, 1819, near Camak, Georgia, the son of Germain Tucker (1794-1821) and his wife Frances Henrietta (née Holcombe). After the early death of Germain Tucker, his widow married a Mr. Hoff and spent many years in Philadelphia, Pennsylvania, before returning to Georgia. Henry Holcombe Tucker's paternal grandfather, Isaiah Tucker, had been born in Amherst, Virginia, and was himself the grandson of Francis Tucker of St. George's, Bermuda, who had emigrated to, and married in, Virginia. The Tucker's of Bermuda are a prominent family in the British Overseas Territory, that date back to the 1616 appointment of Daniel Tucker as Governor of Bermuda, and the family included many other prominent Henry Tuckers. Henry Holcombe Tucker's maternal grandfather was the Reverend Henry Holcombe, D.D.

Henry Holcombe Tucker received a B.A. from the Columbian College at the George Washington University in 1838.

He married Mary C. West in 1848. She died less than a year later.

Henry Holcombe Tucker died in Atlanta on September 9, 1889, after falling from a window.

| Preceded by Andrew A. Lipscomb | President of the University of Georgia; 1874 – 1878 | Succeeded by Patrick H. Mell |
