= James Petigru Boyce =

American theologian (1827–1888)

James P. Boyce
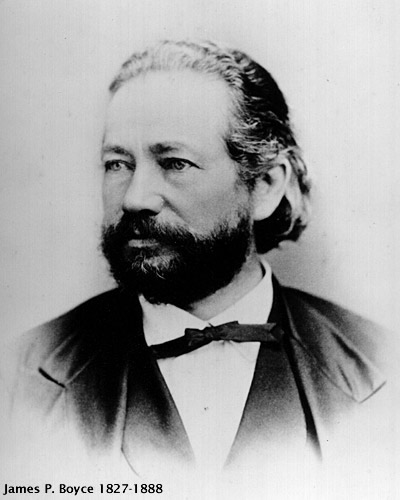

1st President of The Southern Baptist Theological Seminary
- Preceded by: Office established
- Succeeded by: John A. Broadus

Personal details
- Born: James Petrigru Boyce; January 11, 1827 Charleston, SC, US
- Died: December 28, 1888 (aged 61) Louisville, KY, US
- Spouse: Lizzie Ficklin
- Children: Two daughters
- Education: Brown University; Princeton Theological Seminary
- Occupation: Seminary President
- Known for: Theologian

Military service
- Branch/service: Confederate States Army
- Years active: 1845-1888
- Era: 19th century
- Movement: Southern Baptist

James Petigru Boyce (January 11, 1827 – December 28, 1888) was an American pastor, theologian, professor, chaplain, and a principle founder of the Southern Baptist Theological Seminary.

== Biography ==
=== Early life ===
James Petigru Boyce was born in 1827. He was educated at Brown University under Francis Wayland, whose sermons contributed to Boyce's conversion. In 1849 Boyce began studying at Princeton Theological Seminary. His acquaintance with Charles Hodge, a Presbyterian minister and fellow Princeton graduate, led Boyce to adopt Calvinistic theology.

=== Career ===
After completing studies at Princeton, he served as pastor of the Columbia S.C. Baptist Church and as a faculty member at Furman University. In 1859 he founded the Southern Baptist Theological Seminary in Greenville, South Carolina, to establish a seminary that did not view owning slaves as disqualifying of becoming a missionary. After the war ended, he resumed office as chair of the seminary and relocated it to Louisville, Kentucky. He taught theology from 1859 until his death in 1888 and served as the President of the institution. Throughout his ministry, Boyce insisted on the importance of theological education for all ministers. In a preface, he described his Abstract of Systematic Theology, published the year before his death, as follows: "This volume is published the rather as a practical textbook, for the study of the system of doctrine taught in the Word of God, than as a contribution to theological science." During his life, Boyce owned 23 slaves.

=== Civil War ===
While the seminary was closed during the Civil War, Boyce served as a chaplain in the Confederate Army. In 1865 he was elected as a representative to the South Carolina Constitutional Convention. He was a prominent advocate of white supremacy who opposed counting the black population in the census, stating that in his view it would be the “entering wedge of negro suffrage” proclaiming “this is a white man’s government".

Broadus two slaves, William Williams five, Basil Manly Jr. seven, and James P. Boyce twenty-three

=== Death ===
Boyce died in Pau, France on December 28, 1888. He had traveled to Europe with his family in early July 1888 and had been expecting to be traveling abroad for a number of months. News reports at the time indicated that he had been suffering from gout and that while traveling his condition worsened and became fatal.

== Works ==
- Boyce, James Petigru (1856). Three Changes in Theological Institutions: An Inaugural Address. Greenville, S.C.: C. J. Elford's Press.
- Boyce, James Petigru (1882). Abstract of Systematic Theology
- Boyce, James Petigru, (1885). A Brief Catechism Of Bible Doctrine

== Bibliography ==
- Broadus, John Albert (1893). Memoir of James Petigru Boyce, D.D., LL.D.: Late President of the Southern Baptist Theological Seminary, Louisville, Ky. A. C. Armstrong and Son.
- Nettles, Tom J. (2009). James Petigru Boyce: A Southern Baptist Statesman. N.J.: P & R Publishing. ISBN 978-0-87552-664-5.
- Nettles, Tom J., and James P. Boyce. Stray Recollections, Short Articles and Public Orations of James P. Boyce. Cape Coral, Fla: Founders Press, 2009.
- Wills, Gregory A. (2010). Southern Baptist Theological Seminary 1859-2009. Oxford University Press. ISBN 978-0-19-983120-3.

== See also ==
- Southern Baptist Convention
- Southern Baptist Convention Presidents
- Southern Baptist Theological Seminary

Preceded by Patrick Hues Mell	President of the Southern Baptist Convention; James Petigru Boyce; 1872-1879	Succeeded by Patrick Hues Mell

Preceded by Patrick Hues Mell	President of the Southern Baptist Convention; James Petigru Boyce; 1888	Succeeded by Jonathan Haralson
