= Alonzo Church (college president) =

American academic administrator (1793–1862)

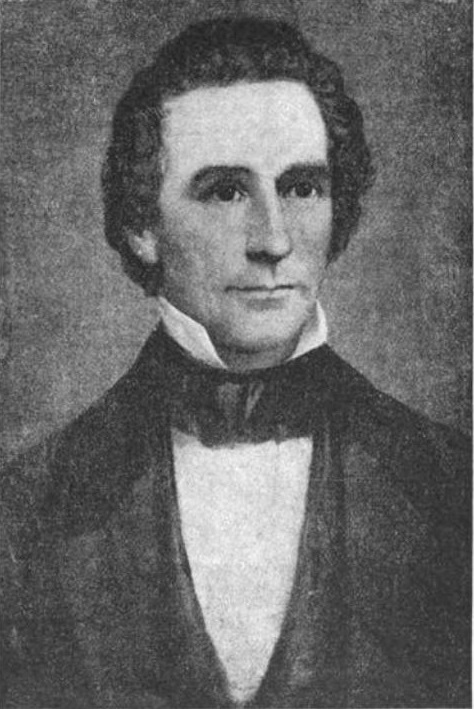

President of the University of Georgia
- In office 1829–1859
- Preceded by: Moses Waddel
- Succeeded by: Andrew A. Lipscomb

Personal details
- Born: April 9, 1793 Brattleboro, Vermont
- Died: May 18, 1862 (aged 69) Athens, Georgia
- Education: Middlebury College

Alonzo Church (April 9, 1793 – May 18, 1862) was the sixth president of the University of Georgia (UGA). He served in that capacity from 1829 until his resignation in 1859.

Church was born on April 9, 1793, in Brattleboro, Vermont. He was an 1816 graduate of Middlebury College. He initially joined the UGA faculty as a professor of Mathematics and served in that capacity for ten years before assuming the presidency.

Although Church served longer than any other president of the university, there were numerous clashes with student and faculty during his tenure which resulted in declines in enrollment and faculty upheaval.

During Church's tenure, the following campus buildings were erected: Classroom/Library (Southern half of current Academic Building, 1831), the Chapel (1832), Phi Kappa Hall (1836), Lumpkin House (Rock House, 1844), Lustrat House (1847), Garden Club House (1857) and The Arch (1858) (funded through sale of the University Botanical Garden for $1,000).

President Church's son, Alonzo Webster Church, was Librarian of the United States Senate. President Church's great-grandson, Alonzo Church, was a renowned Professor of Mathematics; he taught at both Princeton University (his alma mater) and UCLA.

President Church's daughter, Julia, married George Alexander Croom, owner of Casa de Laga Plantation in Tallahassee, Florida, Father of Alonzo Church Croom, Comptroller of the State of Florida from 1900 until his death on December 7, 1912, and brother of Hardy Bryan Croom, a planter and recognized naturalist, who discovered the rare Torreya tree and established Goodwood Plantation.

== Death and legacy ==
Church Street in Athens, Georgia, is named in Church's honor. Church Hall, a dormitory at the University of Georgia, is named for Alonzo Church,

Preceded by Moses Waddel	President of the University of Georgia; 1829 – 1859	Succeeded by Andrew A. Lipscomb
