= William Ellison Boggs =

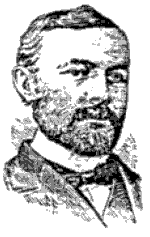

President of the University of Georgia
- In office 1889–1898
- Preceded by: Patrick Hues Mell
- Succeeded by: Walter Barnard Hill

Personal details
- Born: May 12, 1838 India
- Died: August 20, 1920 (aged 82) Baltimore, Maryland
- Education: South Carolina College, Columbia Theological Seminary

Military service
- Rank: Chaplin, Confederate States of America

William Ellison Boggs (May 12, 1838 – August 20, 1920), born in Ahmednagar, India, was chancellor of the University of Georgia (UGA) in Athens, Georgia, United States from 1889 until his resignation in 1898 (He had the title of Chancellor because he was responsible for all Georgia state colleges and universities including the University of Georgia. This was the case from 1860 until 1932) Afterwards, a President had responsibility for just the University of Georgia.)

William Ellison Boggs obtained a B.A. from South Carolina College in 1859 and his Doctor of Divinity, (D.D.) from Columbia Theological Seminary in 1862. Boggs died on August 20, 1920, in Baltimore, Maryland and is buried in Waynesville, North Carolina.

The Early Years of Georgia Football

How a South Carolina College Graduate Helped Start Football At the University of Georgia

1891 is the year that football was introduced to the University of Georgia. The Chancellor, Dr. W. E. Boggs, and the Board of Trustees hired alumnus Dr. Charles Herty as a chemistry professor, but they also gave him the responsibility of forming a football team. The first game was played January 30, 1892, when Georgia met Mercer in Athens with Georgia prevailing 50-0. Georgia played Auburn in Atlanta on February 20 for its second and final game of 1892, losing 10-0. Dr. Herty is usually credited as the coach and Earnest Brown as the trainer for that first season. The next game was not played until November 4, 1893, and Georgia’s opponent was Georgia Tech. By this time, Dr. Herty had been named head of the Department of Physical Culture, which involved primarily the supervision of the football and baseball programs. He would serve in this capacity roughly equivalent to an athletic director until 1899. Today, Dr. Charles Herty is recognized as the father of Georgia football.

On October 23, 1893, an Atlanta newspaper published an article by alumnus Harry Hodgson what would have to be called the manifesto for the University of Georgia football program. The football team was challenged to set its vision on being a national power. The call to arms would have little effect as Georgia would lose to Georgia Tech 28-6 and finish the season 2-2-1.

In 1894, under Robert Winston, Georgia would have its first winning season of 5-1. In 1895, Glenn Scobey “Pop” Warner was hired as coach for $35 per week for ten weeks. Pop Warner was only 3-4 in his first season, but he led Georgia to its first undefeated season, 4-0, in 1896.

In 1895, Georgia became a member of the newly formed Southern Intercollegiate Athletic Association. 1896 would see Georgia crowned as Southern Intercollegiate Athletic Association Co-Champion for its first football championship, but Pop Warner’s term at Georgia would end when Cornell University hired him away. In 1897, Georgia hired Charles McCarthy had seasons of 2-1 and 5-2.

The person who presided over the birth and early growth of the football program was Dr. William Ellison Boggs, DD, LLD, and Chancellor of the University of Georgia from 1889 to 1899. Dr. Boggs was appointed Chancellor after a career as a Presbyterian minister and a professor of ecclesiastical history, metaphysics, and law. Chancellor Boggs was an 1859 graduate of South Carolina College. His roots in South Carolina were deep. The son of a Presbyterian minister and missionary, he grew up in India, Attala (MS), Lowndesville, Winnsboro, and Columbia, SC. Dr. Boggs claimed that his grandfather served under General Thomas Sumter, the original Gamecock. The only time that Georgia played Dr. Boggs’ alma mater South Carolina during his administration was 1894 with Georgia winning 40-0.

Many firsts happened during Dr. Boggs’ tenure as Chancellor of the University of Georgia. He hired the first coach and the first athletic director. The University of Georgia played its first football game, began the "South's Oldest Rivalry" with Auburn in 1892, started the “Clean, Old-fashion Hate” series with Georgia Tech in 1893, had its first undefeated season in 1895, and won its first football championship as part of the Southern Intercollegiate Athletic Association in 1896. Based on the accomplishments during his tenure, Dr. Boggs deserves some recognition. If Dr. Herty is considered the father of Georgia football, Dr. Boggs probably should be acknowledged as the grandfather. The coach, athletic director, and the chancellor all left after the 1898-1899 school year, but the foundation for a national program was set.

By Frank M Boggs and Andrew M Boggs

He was the father of Gilbert Hillhouse Boggs, who was deeply involved with Georgia Tech's Chemistry Department.

Preceded by Patrick Hues Mell	President of the University of Georgia; 1889 – 1898	Succeeded by Walter Barnard Hill
