= Patrick Hues Mell =

American pastor and academic (1814–1888)

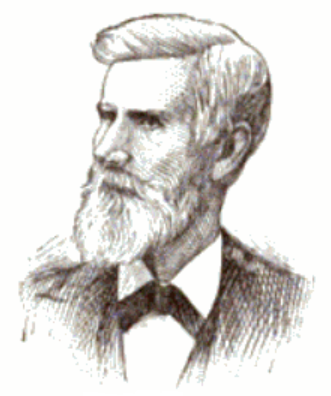

President of the University of Georgia
- In office 1878–1888
- Preceded by: Henry Holcombe Tucker
- Succeeded by: William Ellison Boggs

Personal details
- Born: July 19, 1814 Walthourville, Georgia
- Died: January 26, 1888 (aged 73) Athens, Georgia
- Education: Amherst College

Patrick Hues Mell (July 19, 1814 – January 26, 1888) was the president of the Southern Baptist Convention in two terms from 1863 to 1871 and from 1880 to 1887. He also served as chancellor of the University of Georgia (UGA) in Athens from 1878 until his resignation in 1888. (The head of the university was referred to as chancellor instead of president, from 1860 until 1932).

== Education and early life ==
Mell was born in Walthourville, Georgia, in 1814. He studied at local institutions until he entered Amherst College in 1833 at the age of 19. He studied there for two years but did not graduate with his class. By 1841 Mell had obtained a position at Mercer University as a professor of ancient languages. In 1856 he took a similar position at the University of Georgia. There he was appointed to vice-chancellor in 1860.

== Religion ==
While working as a professor Mell also became very involved in religious works. He served as a pastor in several churches throughout his lifetime. In 1857 Mell was elected president of the Georgia Baptist Convention and three years later was named president of the Southern Baptist Convention. Mell served a total of 16 years as SBC president, the most of any person holding the office, doing so for two separate stints of eight years each.

He retained both positions until his death in Athens on January 26, 1888.

=== Publications ===
He also published many books on religious subjects:

- Baptism in Its Mode and Subjects (1853)
- Corrective Church Discipline (1860)
- A Manual of Parliamentary Practice (1867)
- The Doctrine of Prayer (1876)

== Education career ==
In 1870, Mell introduced the first college course on parliamentary procedure at the University of Georgia. In 1878, the University of Georgia had fallen on hard times. Enrollment and support were in decline, and the school needed a strong leader. Despite his initial unwillingness to take the job, Mell reluctantly accepted the chancellorship, provided, among other things, that the Board of Trustees rescind its rule barring student secret societies (commonly known today as college fraternities). The ban had become a major source of conflict between students and faculty that Mell hoped to avoid. As a result of this action, the modern Greek system that today comprises nearly one-fifth of UGA students owes its existence to Mell.

Another issue Mell tackled was the Trustees' requirement for most students that they live in dormitory housing provided by the university. Believing this to be a bad policy, Mell informed the Board that he could not enforce it. At his urging, they repealed the rule.

Mell was also involved in the expansion of branch colleges. Branches of UGA colleges were established in Dahlonega, Cuthbert, Milledgeville, and Thomasville with only Dahlonega's still in existence. The school, North Georgia College, was the first in the state to admit and award degrees to women. Another branch school that was an issue was the establishment of the School of Technology in the 1880s. Mell was a firm believer that it should be located at Athens with the university's main campus, like the Agricultural and Mechanical School. Despite Mell's arguments, the Georgia Institute of Technology (founded 1885) is today an entirely separate school located in Atlanta, and is the chief rival of the Athens university.

By 1888, Mell had become ill and resigned the chancellor's position; he died shortly thereafter. He was 73 years old.

== Personal life ==
Mell's son Patrick, Jr., became an academic in his own right and served as president of Clemson University (then Clemson College) during 1902-1910.

== Selected readings ==
- Patrick Hues Mell (1844) [1838]. "Slavery : a treatise, showing that slavery is neither a moral, political, nor social evil". Penfield, Ga.: Benj. Brantly. Archived from the original on January 26, 2025. Samuel J. May Collection, Cornell
- Patrick Hues Mell (1858). "Predestination and the saints' perseverance". Charleston, S. C.: Southern Baptist Publication Society. HathiTrust
- Patrick Hues Mell (1871). A Manual of Parliamentary Practice: Rules for Conducting Business in Deliberative Assemblies. New York: Sheldon & Company.
- Patrick Hues Mell, Jr. (1895). Life of Patrick Hues Mell. Louisville, Kentucky: Baptist Book Concern.
- Patrick Hues Mell, Jr. (1897). The Genealogy of the Mell Family in the Southern States. Auburn, Alabama: J. Munsell's Sons.
- Emir Fethi Caner; Ergun Mehmet Caner (2003). The Sacred Trust: Sketches of the Southern Baptist Convention Presidents. Nashville, Tennessee: B&H Publishing Group. ISBN 978-0-8054-2668-7.

== See also ==
- List of Southern Baptist Convention affiliated people
- Southern Baptist Convention
- Southern Baptist Convention Presidents

Preceded by Henry Holcombe Tucker	President of the University of Georgia; 1878 – 1888	Succeeded by William Ellison Boggs

Preceded by Richard Fuller	President of the Southern Baptist Convention; 1863–1871	Succeeded by James P. Boyce

Preceded by James P. Boyce	President of the Southern Baptist Convention; 1880-1887	Succeeded by James P. Boyce
