= Andrew A. Lipscomb =

American academic administrator (1816–1890)

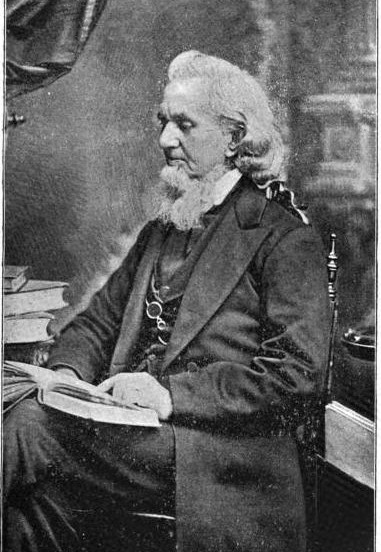

President of the University of Georgia
- In office 1860–1874
- Preceded by: Alonzo Church
- Succeeded by: Henry H. Tucker

Personal details
- Born: September 5, 1816 Georgetown, Washington, D.C.
- Died: November 23, 1890 (aged 74) Athens, Georgia

Andrew Adgate Lipscomb (September 5, 1816 – November 23, 1890) was an American clergyman and educator.

Lipscomb was born in Georgetown, Washington, D.C. As a young man, he entered the ministry of the Methodist Protestant church, joining the Maryland conference in 1835, and for some time was President of the Alabama conference. From 1842 to 1849 he was pastor of the Bibb Street Methodist Protestant Church in Montgomery, Alabama, which was dedicated shortly after his arrival; he had solicited a move to Alabama because the climate was better suited for the pulmonary tuberculosis that had plagued him for a number of years. During his tenure in Montgomery he warned of the dangers of Irish immigration to the United States and the accompanying growth of Catholicism in a book, Our Country: Its Danger and Duty (New York, 1844). He fared well in Montgomery as a preacher, providing for a family consisting of a wife, two children, and two sisters, and owning two slaves. Compelled by tuberculosis to retire from the ministry, he founded in 1849 the Metropolitan Institute for Young Ladies at Montgomery, Alabama. Lipscomb then served as the inaugural President (1856–1859) of the Tuskegee Female College of the Methodist Episcopal Church South in Alabama (present-day Huntingdon College in Montgomery, Alabama).

From 1860 until his resignation in 1874, Lipscomb served as the Chancellor of the University of Georgia (UGA) in Athens. Lipscomb was the first leader of UGA to have the title Chancellor instead of President.

His tenure included a multi-year period (fall of 1863 through January 1866) during which the University was closed due to the American Civil War. Also, for the year preceding Lipscomb's Chancellorship (1859), the University had no presiding official (neither President nor Chancellor) between the time of President Church's resignation and Chancellor Lipscomb's start as the University underwent a comprehensive reorganization. His administration oversaw the construction of the library (currently the north half of the Holmes-Hunter Academic Building) in 1862 and Moore College in 1874.

The offspring of Lipscomb and his first wife, Henrietta Blanche Richardson, also contributed to the University. Their son, Francis Adgate Lipscomb, was a faculty member of the English department. Their grandson, Judge Thomas F. Green, served as a law professor at UGA and as a member of the Board of Regents of the University System of Georgia. Their great-grandson, Thomas F. Green Jr., also served as a faculty member of the Law School.

Lipscomb Hall, a UGA dormitory, is named in the former chancellor's honor.

After Lipscomb's academic career, he wrote Studies in the Forty Days between Christ's Resurrection and Ascension (1885) and Studies Supplementary to the Studies in the Forty Days between Christ's Resurrection and Ascension (1886). He died in 1890 in Athens and was buried in Oconee Hill Cemetery in the same city.

Preceded by Alonzo Church	Chancellor of the University of Georgia; 1860 – 1874	Succeeded by Henry H. Tucker
