= David Crenshaw Barrow Jr. =

American mathematician

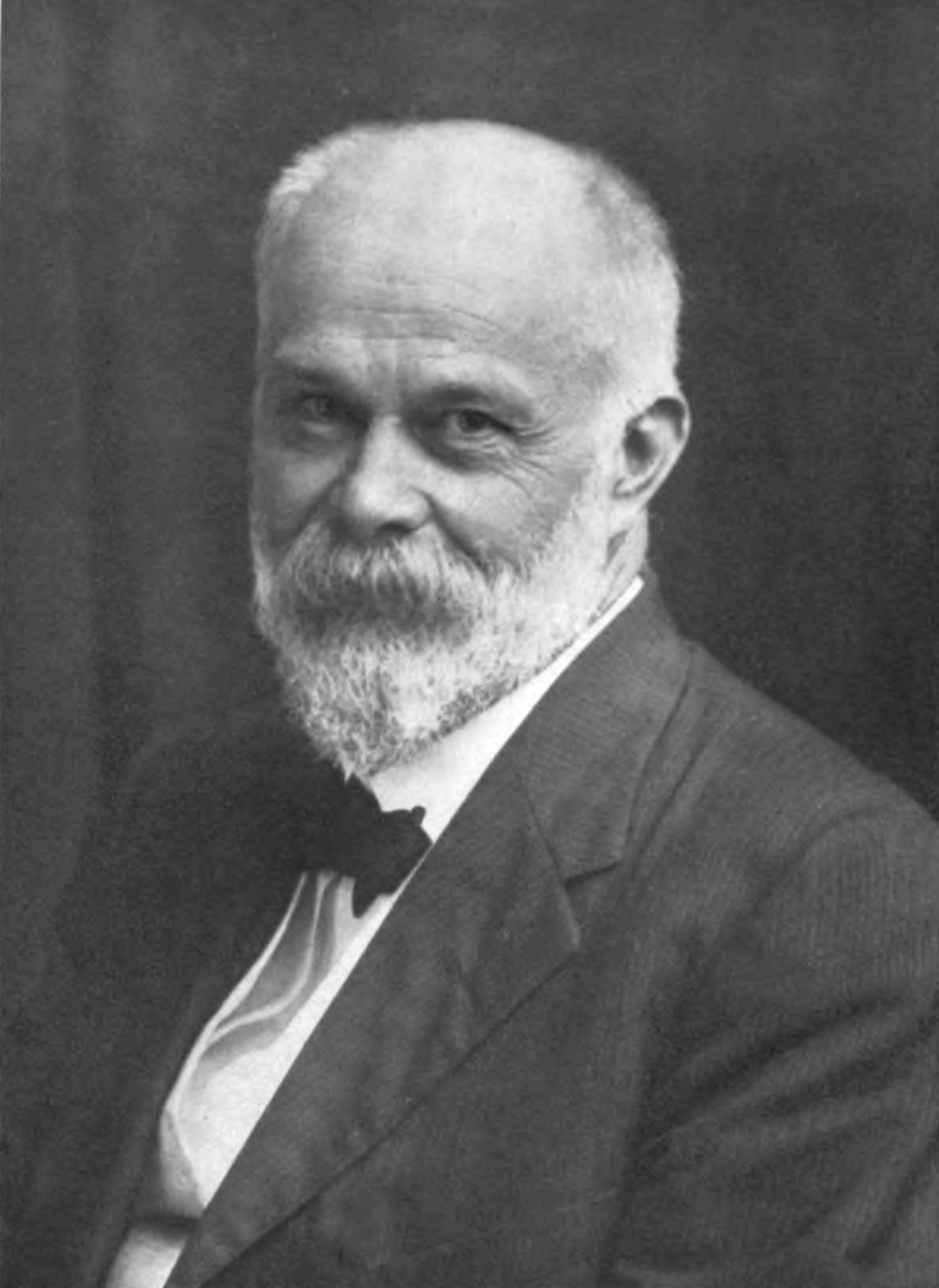

President of the University of Georgia
- In office 1906–1925
- Preceded by: Walter Barnard Hill
- Succeeded by: Charles Mercer Snelling

Personal details
- Born: October 18, 1852 Oglethorpe County, Georgia
- Died: January 11, 1929 (aged 76) Athens, Georgia
- Education: University of Georgia

David Crenshaw Barrow Jr. (October 18, 1852 – January 11, 1929) served as chancellor of the University of Georgia (UGA) in Athens from 1906 until his resignation in 1925 (The head of the university was referred to as chancellor instead of president from 1860 until 1932).

== Early life and education ==
Barrow was born in Wolfskin District, Oglethorpe County, Georgia, on October 18, 1852. His father was David C. Barrow Sr., a planter and a trustee at the university, and his mother was Sarah Pope Barrow. One of his sons, David Francis Barrow, became a member of the UGA Mathematics faculty.

Barrow was educated at the University of Georgia, class of 1874, where he was a member of Chi Phi fraternity. He became an adjunct professor of mathematics at the university in 1878. His additional responsibilities included Professor of civil engineering (1883), Head of the combined Department of Mathematics and Civil Engineering, Head of Pure Mathematics, and Dean of the Franklin College in 1899. He became the acting chancellor upon then-Chancellor Hill's death (1905). He was subsequently officially named Chancellor in 1906.

== University of Georgia ==
The following schools were created during his tenure: school of education (1908), commerce (1912) (currently known as the Terry College of Business), and journalism (1915). Beginning in 1903, female students were admitted for the first time as summer students and were later enrolled as graduate students (1916) and finally undergraduates (1918).

Upon his resignation, Barrow was named chancellor emeritus by the Georgia Board of Regents.

== Later years ==
Chancellor Barrow died in 1929 at his home in Athens. Funeral services were held in the Chapel on UGA's north campus, and he was buried in Oconee Hill Cemetery in Athens. Barrow County, Georgia an Athens elementary school, an Athens street, Barrow Hall at the university and the David C. Barrow Chair of Mathematics all honor the late Chancellor.

== Notes ==
Preceded by Walter Barnard Hill	President of the University of Georgia; 1906 – 1925	Succeeded by Charles Mercer Snelling
