= Walter Barnard Hill =

American academic (1851–1905)

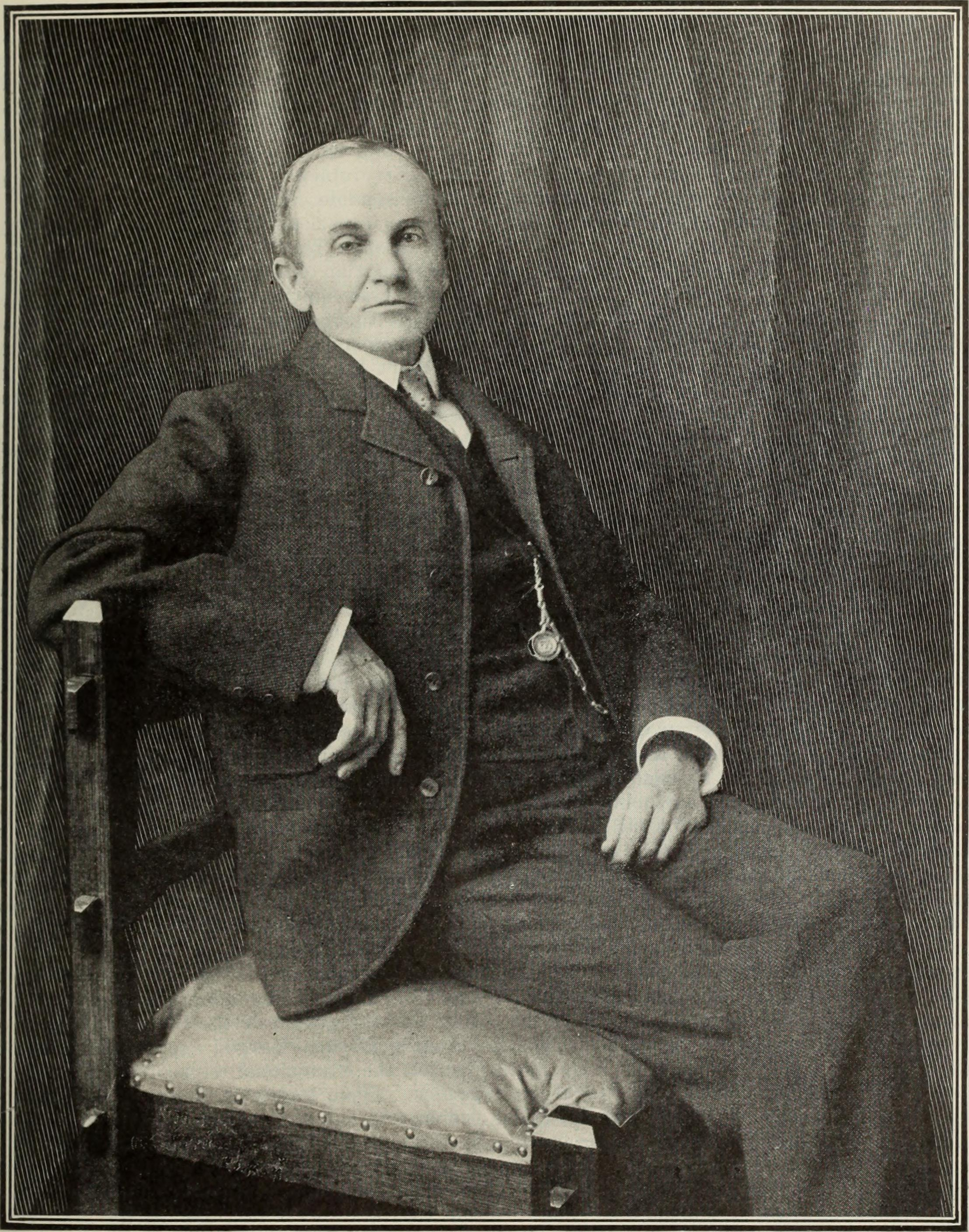

University of Georgia
- In office 1899–1905
- Preceded by: William Ellison Boggs
- Succeeded by: David Crenshaw Barrow Jr.

Personal details
- Born: September 5, 1851 Talbotton, Georgia; United States
- Died: December 28, 1905 (aged 54) Athens, Georgia
- Education: University of Georgia

Walter Barnard Hill (September 5, 1851 – December 28, 1905) was chancellor of the University of Georgia (UGA) in Athens from 1899 until his death in 1905 (The head of the university was referred to as chancellor, from 1860 until 1932).

== Biography ==
Hill was born in Talbotton, Georgia. He obtained three degrees from the university: A.B. (1870), M.A. (1871), and Bachelor of Laws (B.L.) (1871) and was a member of Chi Phi fraternity. He practiced law in Macon, Georgia.

Hill's efforts eventually led to contraction of pneumonia, and he died in office in December 1905. He was buried in the Oconee Hill Cemetery in Athens.

=== Accomplishments ===
Walter Bernard Hill Hall on the campus of Savannah State University is named in honor of Dr. Hill.

* Created the foundations for the College of Agriculture and the College of Education

- Expanded the law curriculum from one to two years
- Established a School of Pharmacy (1903)
- Prepared for the School of Forestry (1906)
- Secured $151,000 in funding from the Georgia General Assembly between 1900 and 1905 (as opposed to just $8,000 in 1899)
- Opened the following buildings on the university of Georgia campus: Denmark Hall (1901), Peabody Library (1905); Science Hall/Terrell Hall (1897/1904), Candler Hall (1902), and Meigs (originally, LeConte) Hall (1905).

Preceded by William Ellison Boggs	President of the University of Georgia; 1899 – 1905	Succeeded by David Crenshaw Barrow Jr.
