= List of University of Georgia people =

This list of University of Georgia people includes alumni, affiliates, and current students of the University of Georgia. Honorary degree recipients are not included.

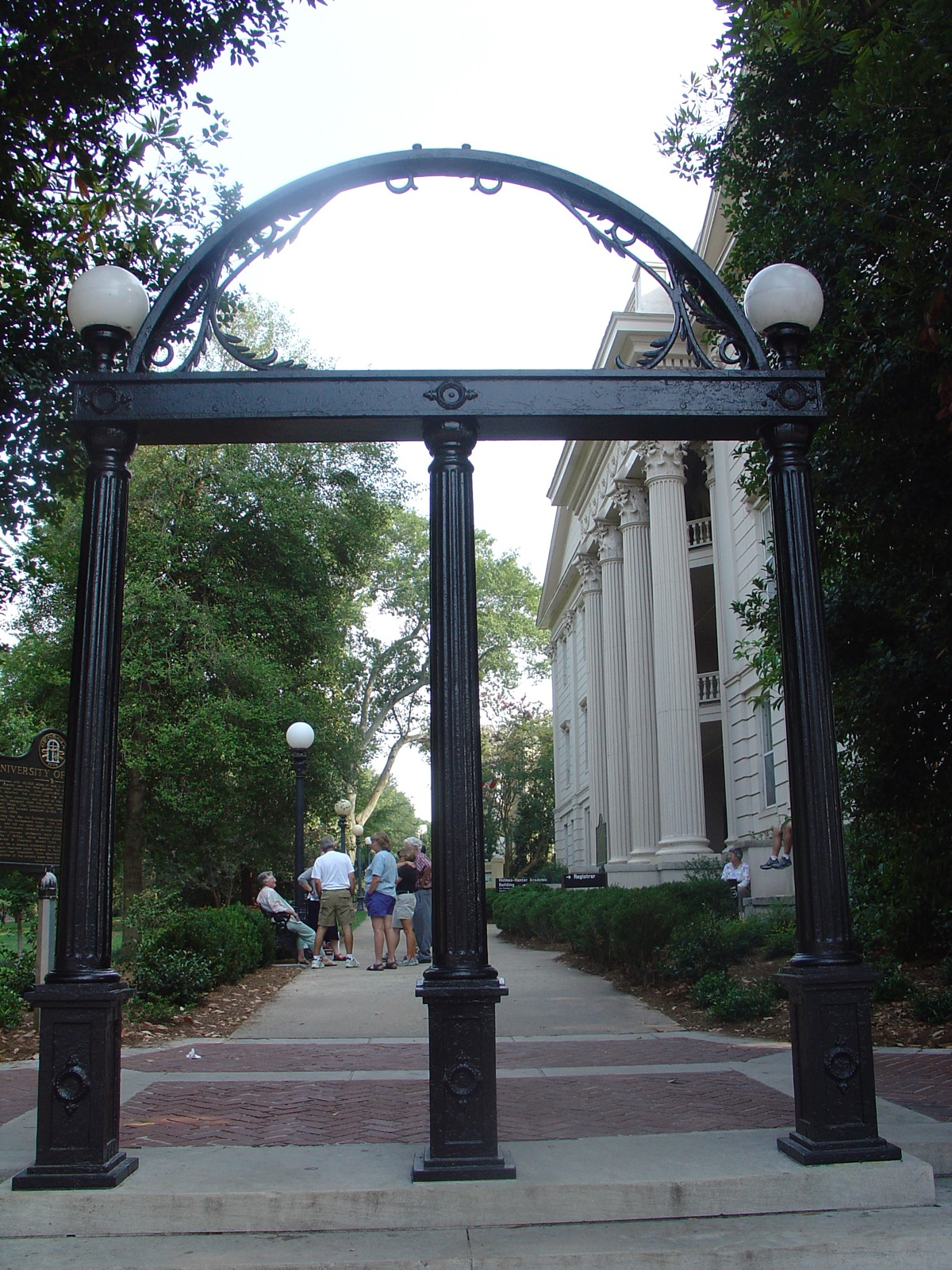
The Georgia Arch, the historic icon and symbol of the University of Georgia, is recognized by UGA alumni, faculty, and students around the world.

== Chief executives and presidents of the University of Georgia ==
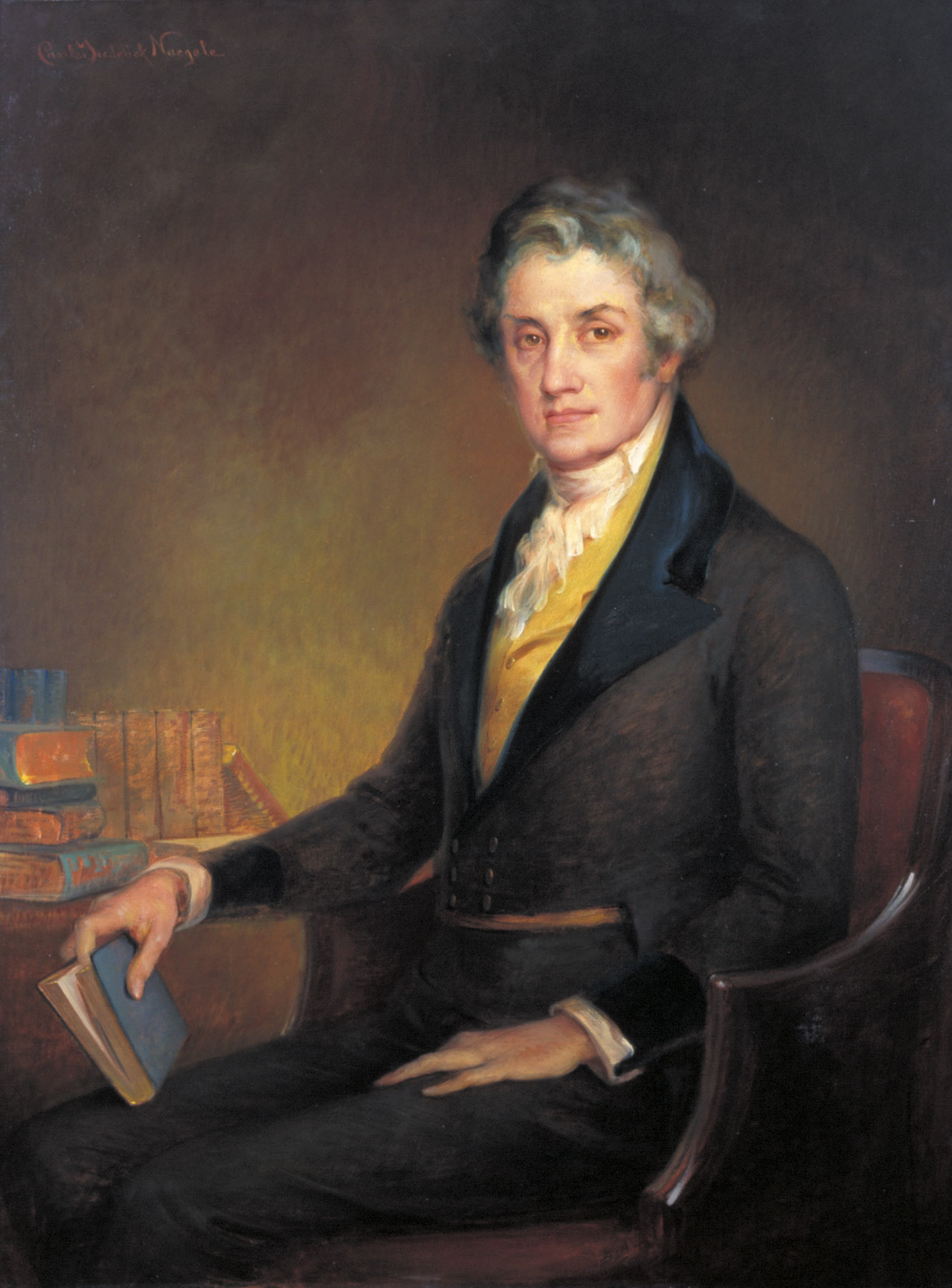
Abraham Baldwin, Patriot and Founding Father, a founder and first president of the University of Georgia, representative to the U.S. Constitutional Convention, creating the United States of America, signer of the U.S. Constitution, and president pro tempore of the United States Senate

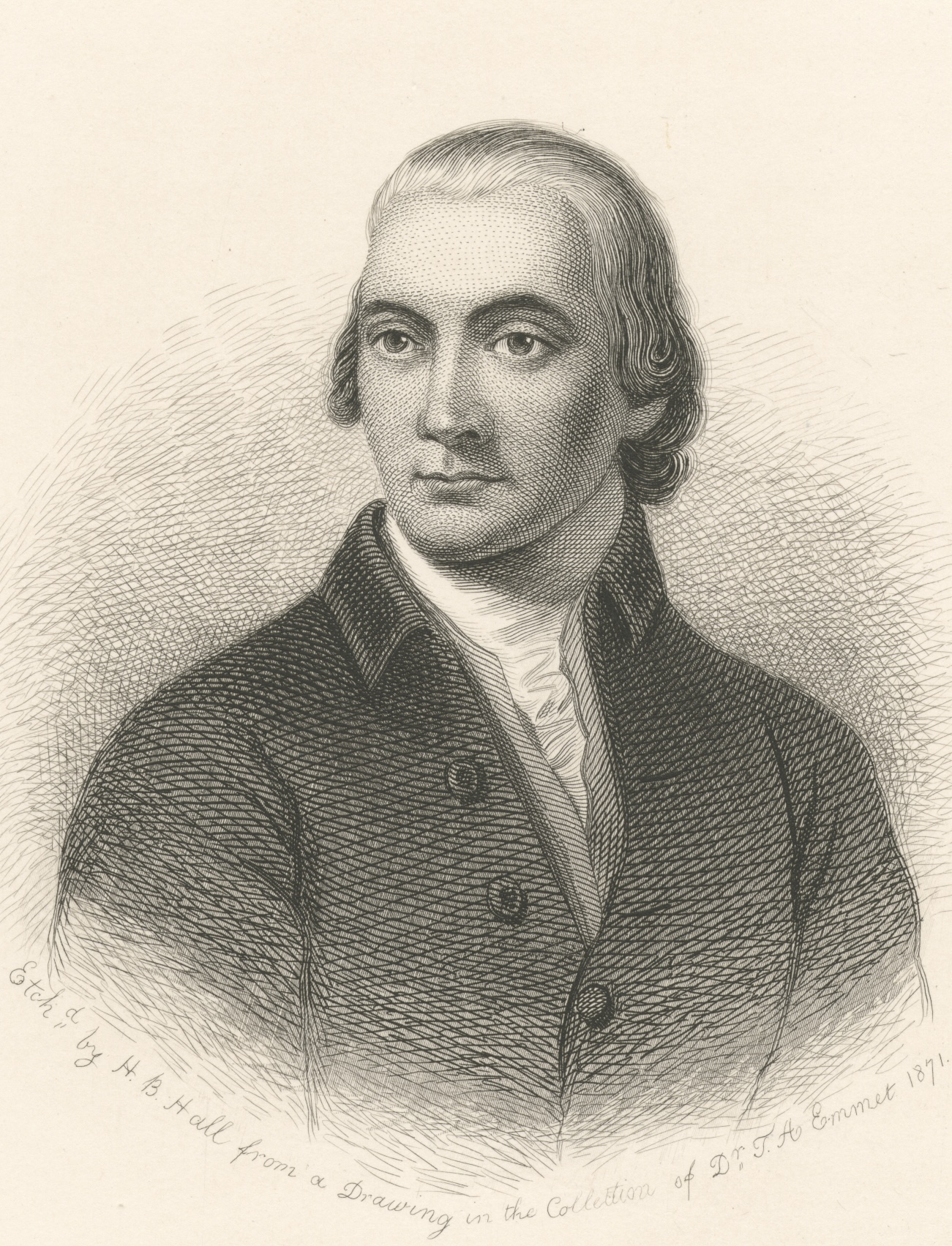
Lyman Hall, physician, signer of the Declaration of Independence, member of the Continental Congress, governor, and one of the founders of the University of Georgia

- Abraham Baldwin, president (1785–1801; 16 years)
- Josiah Meigs, president (1801–1810; 9 years)
- John Brown, president (1811–1816; 6 years)
- Robert Finley, president (1817; 1 year)
- Moses Waddel, president (1819–1829; 10 years)
- Alonzo Church, president (1829–1859; 30 years)
- Andrew A. Lipscomb, chancellor (1860–1874; 15 years)
- Henry Holcombe Tucker, chancellor (1874–1878; 4 years)
- Patrick Hues Mell, chancellor (1878–1888; 10 years)
- William Ellison Boggs, chancellor (1889–1898; 9 years)
- Walter Barnard Hill, chancellor (1899–1905; 6 years)
- David Crenshaw Barrow Jr., chancellor (1906–1925; 20 years)
- Charles Mercer Snelling, chancellor (1925–1932; 7 years)
- Steadman Vincent Sanford, president (1932–1935; 3 years)
- Harmon White Caldwell, president (1935–1948; 13 years)
- Jonathan Clark Rogers, president (1949–1950; 2 years)
- Omer Clyde Aderhold, president (1950–1967; 17 years)
- Frederick Corbet Davison, president (1967–1986; 19 years)
- Henry King Stanford, interim president (1986–1987; 1 year)
- Charles Boynton Knapp, president (1987–1997; 10 years)
- Michael F. Adams, president (1997–2013; 16 years)
- Jere Morehead, president (2013–present)

== Alumni ==
=== Arts, media and entertainment ===
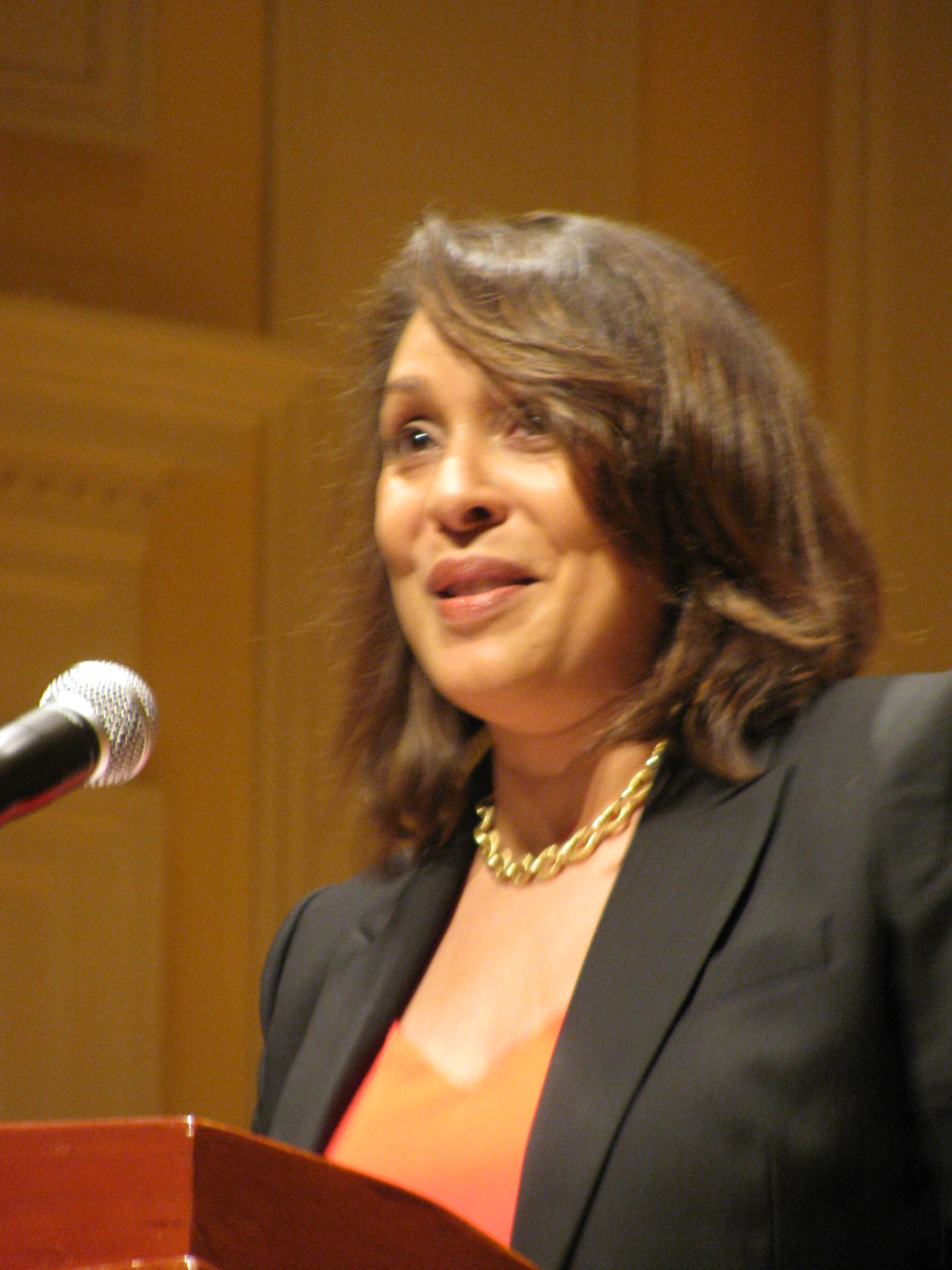
Natasha Trethewey, United States Poet Laureate 2012, 2014, Pulitzer Prize winner 2007, Heinz Award in Arts and Humanities 2017

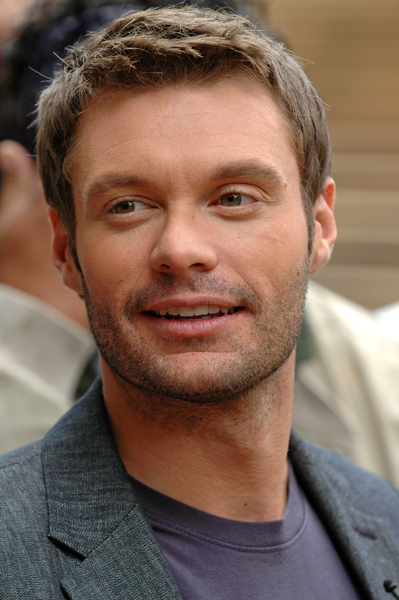
Ryan Seacrest, Emmy Award-winning television host, radio personality, actor and producer

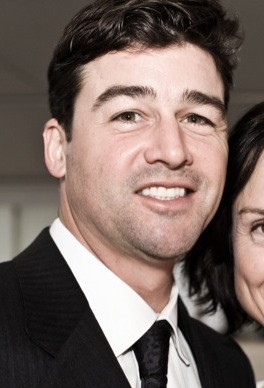
Kyle Chandler, Primetime Emmy Award-winning actor

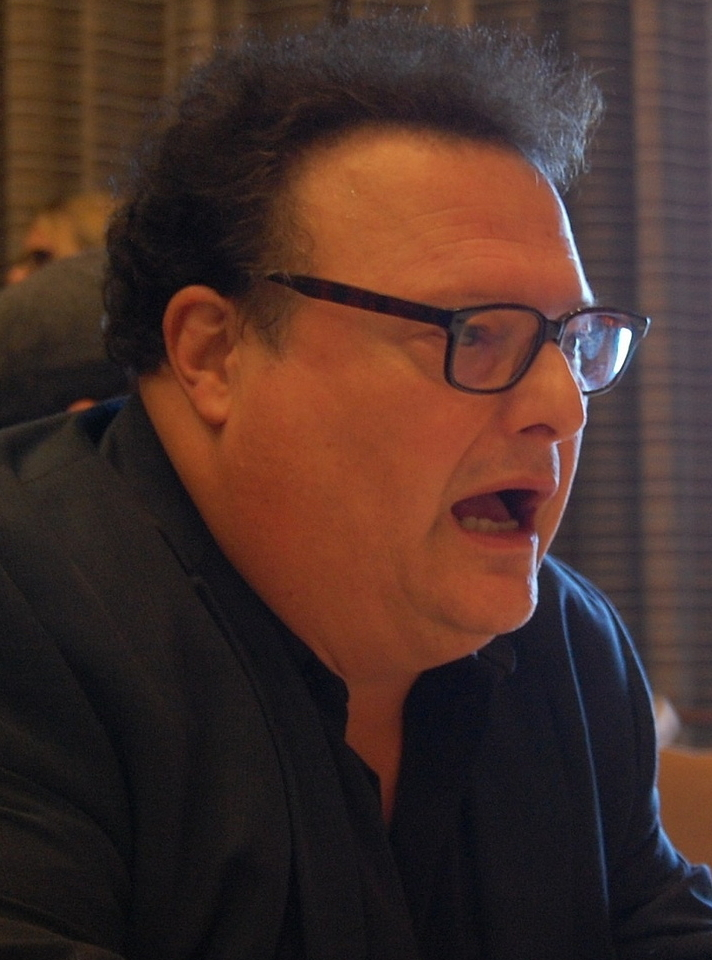
Wayne Knight, actor known for parts in Seinfeld, Jurassic Park

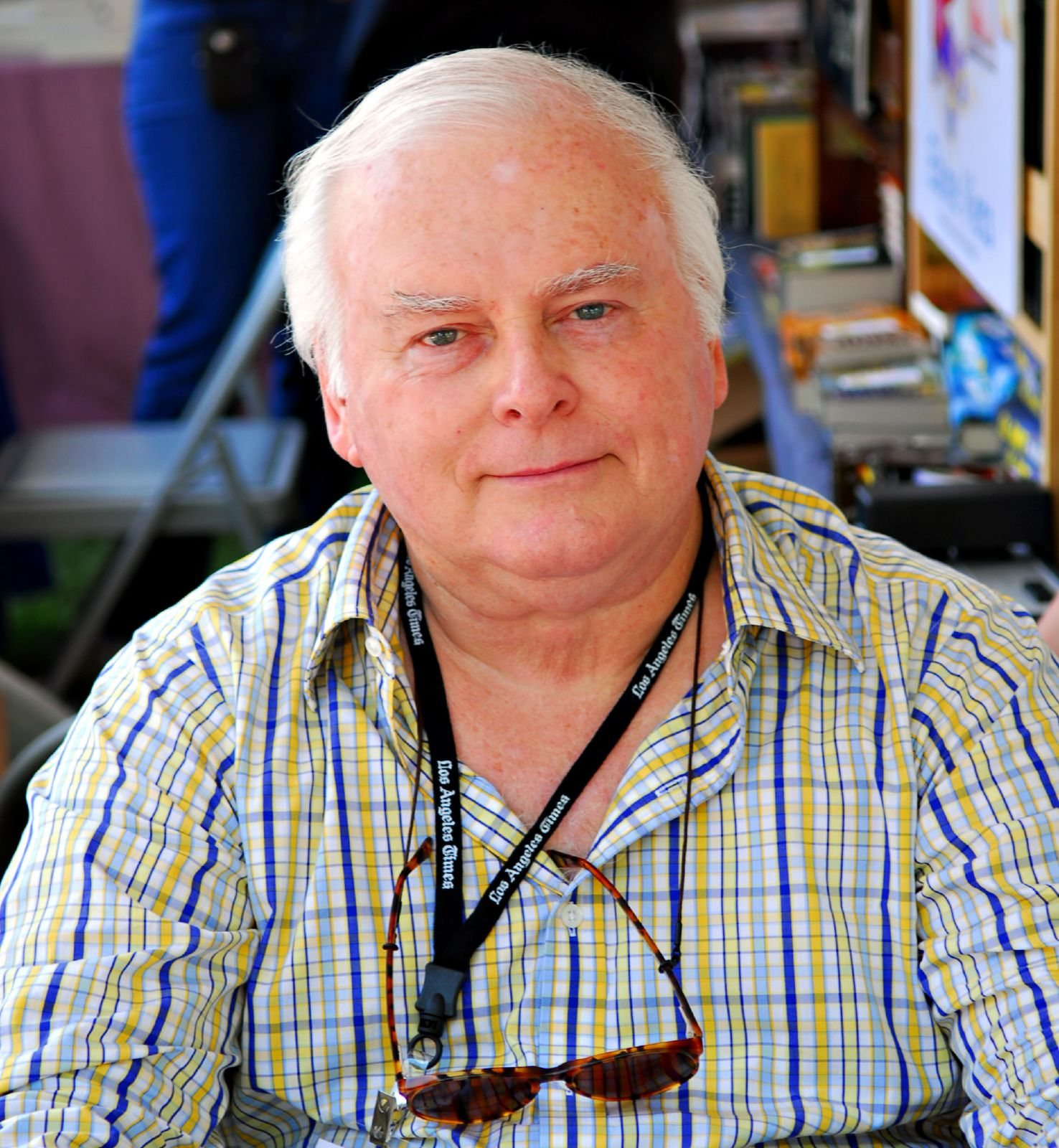
Stuart Woods, Edgar Award-winning novelist

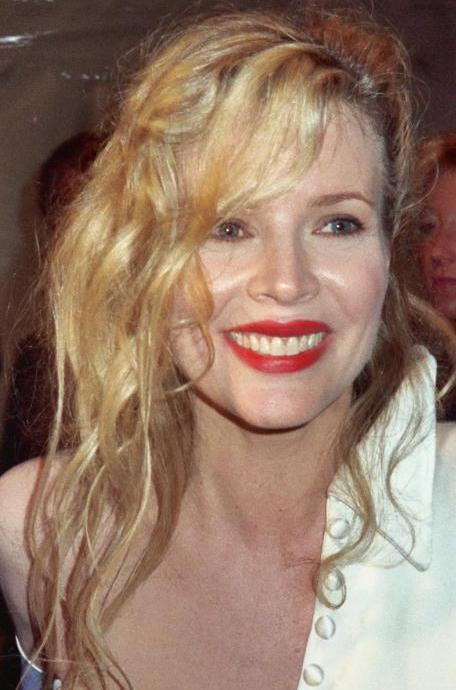
Kim Basinger, winner of the BAFTA Award, Golden Globe Award, Screen Actors Guild Award, and Academy Award for Best Supporting Actress

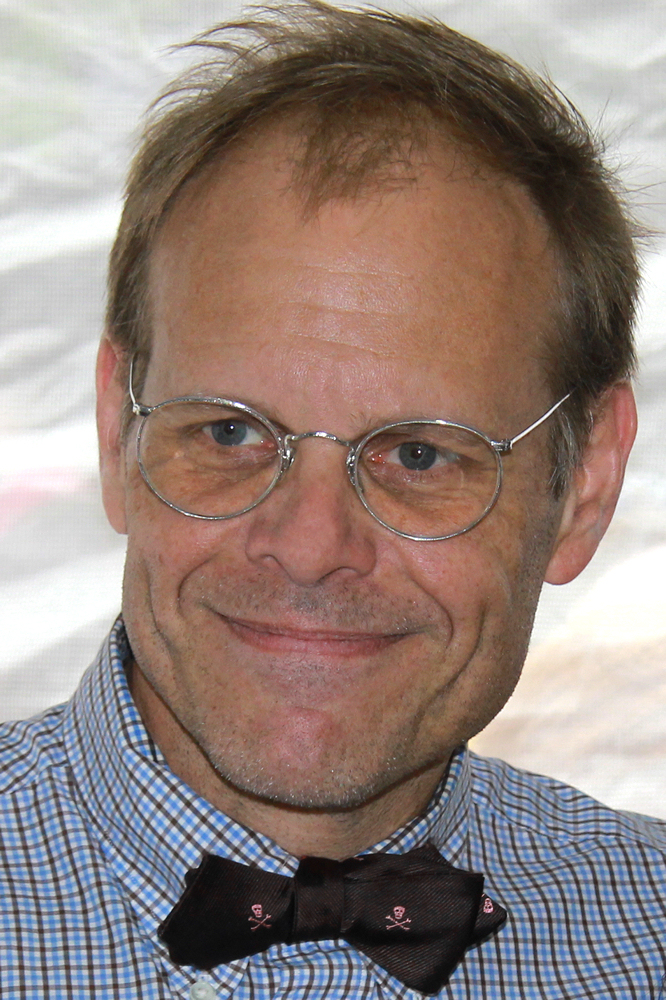
Alton Brown, chef, author, television personality, actor, cinematographer, host of Good Eats and other food-related shows, here host at the 2011 Texas Book Festival, Austin, Texas

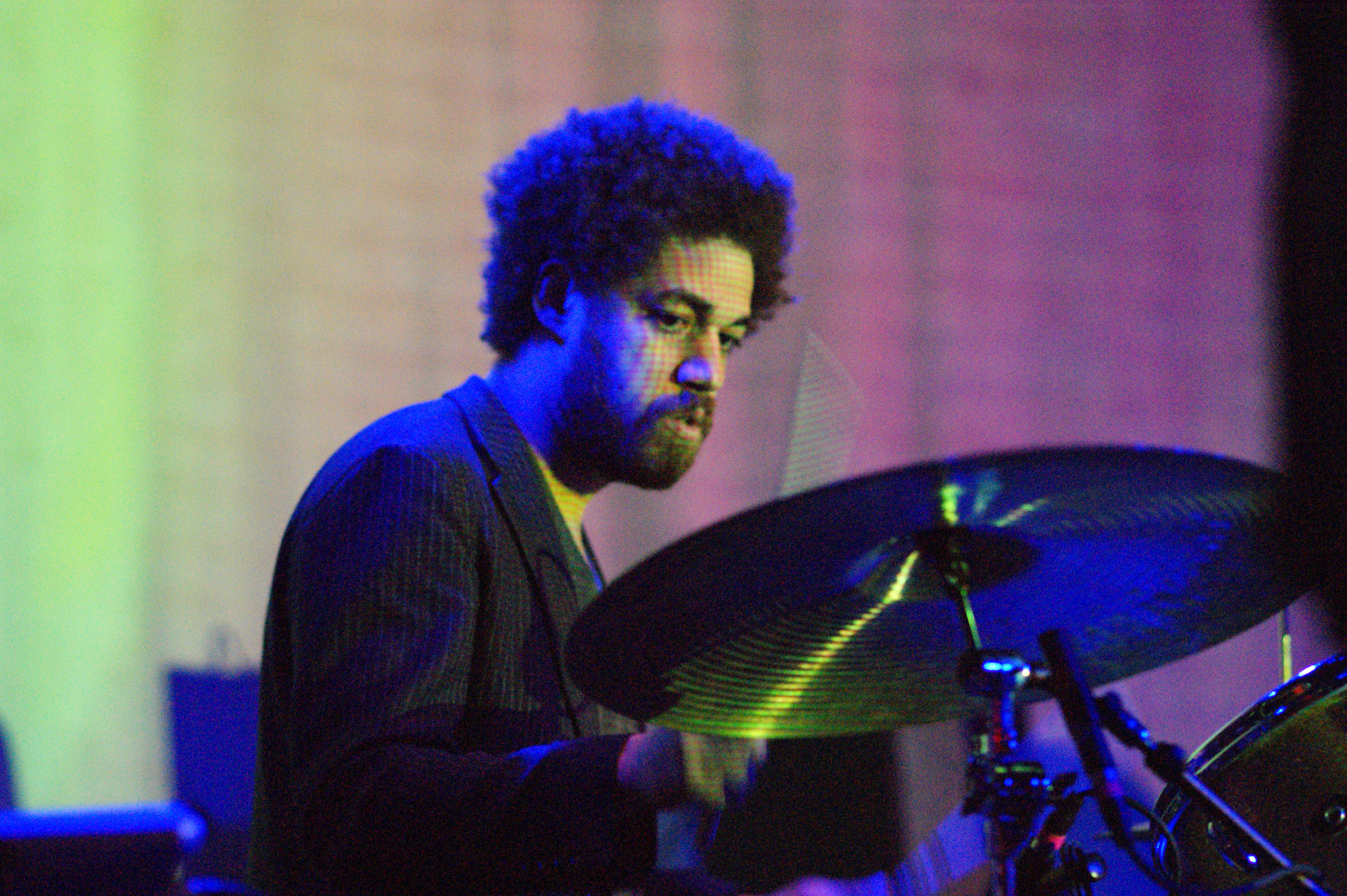
Danger Mouse (Brian Joseph Burton), Grammy Award-winning musician, songwriter and record producer

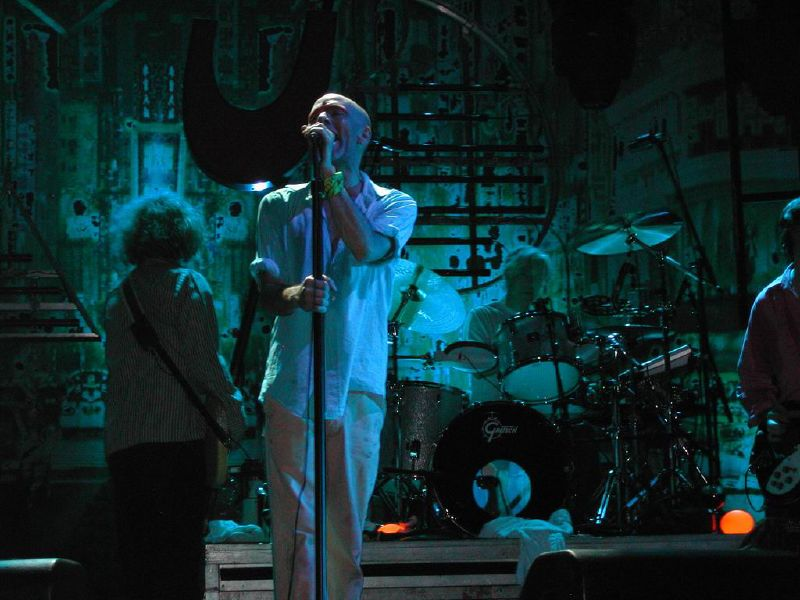
R.E.M., a winner of Grammy, Billboard Music, MTV Video Music, and other Awards after Michael Stipe, Peter Buck, Mike Mills, and Bill Berry connected during their time at the University of Georgia

Brandon Stanton, The New York Times Best Selling author and one of Time's "30 Under 30 People Changing The World" visits President Barack Obama at the White House

- Dottie Alexander, keyboardist for of Montreal
- Bill Anderson, musician, songwriter and television personality whose albums have reached No. 1 on the charts seven times; 29 of his singles have reached the top ten; has memberships in several halls of fame including the Songwriters Hall of Fame
- Teniola Apata, Nigerian singer
- The B-52's, new wave rock band
- Kim Basinger, actress; won the BAFTA Award, Golden Globe Award, Screen Actors Guild Award, and the Academy Award for Best Supporting Actress
- John Bell, lead singer for band Widespread Panic
- Bill Berry, musician; member of alternative rock band R.E.M.
- Michael Lawson Bishop, writer of more than 30 books creating what has been called a "body of work that stands among the most admired and influential in modern literature" in his genre
- Alton Brown, television personality, author, actor, cinematographer, chef and host of Good Eats and other food related shows
- Peter Buck, musician; member of alternative rock band R.E.M.
- Tituss Burgess, Broadway, film and TV actor and singer; has appeared in numerous Broadway musicals; best known for starring as Titus Andromedon on the Netflix comedy series Unbreakable Kimmy Schmidt, and for 30 Rock, for which he received four consecutive Primetime Emmy Award for Outstanding Supporting Actor in a Comedy Series nominations
- Chip Caray, television broadcaster for Fox Sports, former broadcaster for the Chicago Cubs and other professional teams
- Casey J, gospel singer best known for song "Fill Me Up", which reached number 1 on the Billboard Gospel chart, whose debut album, The Truth, reached number 1 on the Billboard Top Gospel Albums chart and 131 on the US Billboard 200; described by The Chicago Defender as "gospel's newest darling"
- Kyle Chandler, Primetime Emmy Award-winning film and television actor best known for his role as Deputy Jackson Lamb in the film Super 8, and in the television shows Early Edition as Gary Hobson, Grey's Anatomy as Dylan Young, and as Coach Eric Taylor in Friday Night Lights
- Mike Chapman, co-creator of Homestar Runner
- Danger Mouse (Brian Joseph Burton), multiple Grammy Award-winning musician, songwriter, record producer, and collaborator in DangerDoom and Gnarls Barkley
- Jack Davis, artist, cartoonist and illustrator, known for his advertising art, magazine covers, film posters, record album art and numerous comic book stories who was one of the founding cartoonists for Mad Magazine; inducted into the Will Eisner Hall of Fame, received the National Cartoonists Society's Milton Caniff Lifetime Achievement Award, Advertising Award, and Reuben Award and other awards, as well as an exhibition of his work at the Society of Illustrators in New York City and induction into the Society of Illustrators Hall of Fame
- Tom Deitz, novelist, professor, and artist
- Leonard DeLonga, sculptor, painter, and professor
- Julian Dorio, drummer for The Whigs
- Annie F. Downs, author, podcaster, and public speaker
- Tiffany Dupont, actress, most known for roles in One Night with the King and Greek
- Bobbie Eakes, soap opera actress and singer
- Costaki Economopoulos, comedian
- Rob Evan, actor and singer
- Jerry Fuchs, indie rock drummer for Turing Machine, The Juan MacLean, !!! and Maserati; performed drums live with the groups MSTRKRFT, Massive Attack and LCD Soundsystem
- Doreen Gentzler, television news anchor
- Jennifer Holloway, operatic mezzo-soprano and soprano
- Disco Inferno (Glenn Gilbertti), professional wrestler
- Parker Gispert, lead singer for The Whigs
- Bill Goldberg, professional football player, professional wrestler and actor
- Patricia Goslee, painter and curator currently residing in Washington, DC
- Lewis Grizzard, writer and humorist
- Omari Hardwick, actor
- Colleen Haskell, former reality show contestant and actress
- Dave Haywood, music writer, musician, and founding member of the Grammy Award-winning band Lady Antebellum, later known as Lady A
- Shuler Hensley, actor
- Anne T. Hill, fashion designer
- Sarah Hobbs, artist whose work has been exhibited in notable public collections such as the Art Institute of Chicago, the Brooklyn Museum of Art, Los Angeles County Museum of Art
- Josh Holloway, actor, known for his role as James "Sawyer" Ford on the television show Lost
- Michael Houser, former lead guitar player and vocalist for Widespread Panic
- Clark Howell, Pulitzer Prize-winning newspaperman and journalist
- Raymond Hughes, conductor and former chorus master of the Metropolitan Opera
- Solomon Hughes, educator, athlete, and actor
- Ernie Johnson Jr., television host, anchor
- Charles Kelley, music writer, lead singer, and founding member of the Grammy Award-winning band Lady Antebellum, later known as Lady A
- Wayne Knight, actor, best known for playing "Newman" from Seinfeld and his role as Dennis Nedry from Jurassic Park
- Alex Kresovich, music producer and songwriter, best known for his work with Panic! at the Disco and Cee Lo Green
- Matt Lanter, actor, former reality TV personality and model, gained fame by playing Liam Court in The CW's teen drama series 90210 and has appeared in some major released films, such as Star Wars: The Clone Wars
- Oksana Lushchevska, children's books writer, translator, and poet
- Lera Lynn, singer, songwriter, musician, and actress
- Richard Mandell, writer, golf course architect, and radio show personality
- Kate Michael, Miss District of Columbia 2006, recipient of the Bryce Harlow Award, writer, on-camera host, emcee, and model
- Mike Mills, musician; member of alternative rock band R.E.M.
- Pat Mitchell, media industry CEO, producer, professor, and author who has taught at the University of Georgia and at Harvard University's John F. Kennedy School of Government, worked at NBC (where she was the first woman to produce and host a national program), CNN, PBS, TED conferences, awarded a Lifetime Achievement Award by Women's Media Center, the Sandra Day O'Connor Award for Leadership, the Bodley Medal from Oxford University, inducted into the Broadcasting Hall of Fame, Council on Foreign Relations, the International Academy of Television Arts and Sciences, and, as producer of documentaries and specials, recipient of 35 Emmy Awards and five Peabody Awards
- Marion Montgomery, poet, novelist, educator, and critic
- Megan Moroney, country music artist
- Winfield Myers, journalist and public intellectual
- Fred Newman, three time Emmy Award-winning actor, voice actor, composer, comedian, and musician known for work on A Prairie Home Companion
- Augusta Oelschig, American Scene painter known for realist genre paintings of everyday life in Savannah
- Delia Owens, author and zoologist, author of several internationally bestselling nonfiction books, and with her debut novel topping The New York Times Best Sellers List for several weeks and remaining on the list for over a year
- Monica Padman, podcaster, actor, and producer
- Phaedra Parks, television personality known for The Real Housewives of Atlanta
- Mikey Post, actor
- Emilio Pucci, Italian fashion designer
- Pylon, post-punk band; all four members attended the university: Vanessa Briscoe Hay, Randall Bewley, Curtis Crowe, and Michael Lachowski
- San E, Korean hip hop rapper, debuted under JYP Entertainment in 2010
- Ryan Seacrest, Emmy Award-winning television and radio personality, television host, and producer; American Idol host
- Fred Schneider, singer, songwriter, arranger, and musician, best known as the frontman of the rock band The B-52s, of which he is a founding member
- Dave Schools, bass player and vocalist for Widespread Panic
- Richard T. Scott, 21st-century classical painter, Host of artist interview series "Outside the Lines", published writer, and numismatic designer for the United States Mint working in New York City and Paris
- Parvati Shallow, television host and personality, star of CBS's Around the World For Free, and $1 million winner of the television series Survivor: Micronesia — Fans vs. Favorites
- Sonny Shroyer, actor in films such as The Dukes of Hazzard, Forrest Gump, The Rainmaker, and Ray
- IronE Singleton, actor, The Walking Dead
- A. E. Stallings, poet; won a Poets' Prize, received a Guggenheim Fellowship and a MacArthur Foundation Fellowship (the "Genius Grant"); named a Fellow of United States Artists
- Brandon Stanton, best-selling author and creator of the popular "Humans of New York", his first book reaching the number 1 position on The New York Times Best Seller list, named one of Time's "30 Under 30 People Changing The World", winner of the James Joyce Award
- Michael Stipe, musician; member of alternative rock band R.E.M.
- Luke Tan, country singer
- Maria Taylor, ESPN & SEC Network correspondent
- Natasha Trethewey, United States Poet Laureate 2012, 2014, Pulitzer Prize winner 2007, Heinz Award in Arts and Humanities 2017
- James Michael Tyler, actor, most known for his role in the TV show Friends as Gunther
- Gy Waldron, screenwriter and director best known as the writer/director of the movie Moonrunners, and other films, the show One Day at a Time, and creator of the television series, The Dukes of Hazzard
- Charles Wadsworth, classical pianist and composer, performed at Lincoln Center, the White House many times, originated concerts at the Festival dei Due Mondi in Spoleto and at the Spoleto Festival USA, received awards from the French and Italian governments, and received the Handel Medallion, the highest award given by the City of New York for his contributions to the intellectual and cultural life of the city
- Pierce Wallace, ESPN Fan Hall of Fame, actor, and television personality
- Philip Lee Williams, novelist, poet, essayist documentary film maker and composer
- Stuart Woods, Edgar Award-winning writer of 73 novels
- Trisha Yearwood, country singer

=== Business and industry ===
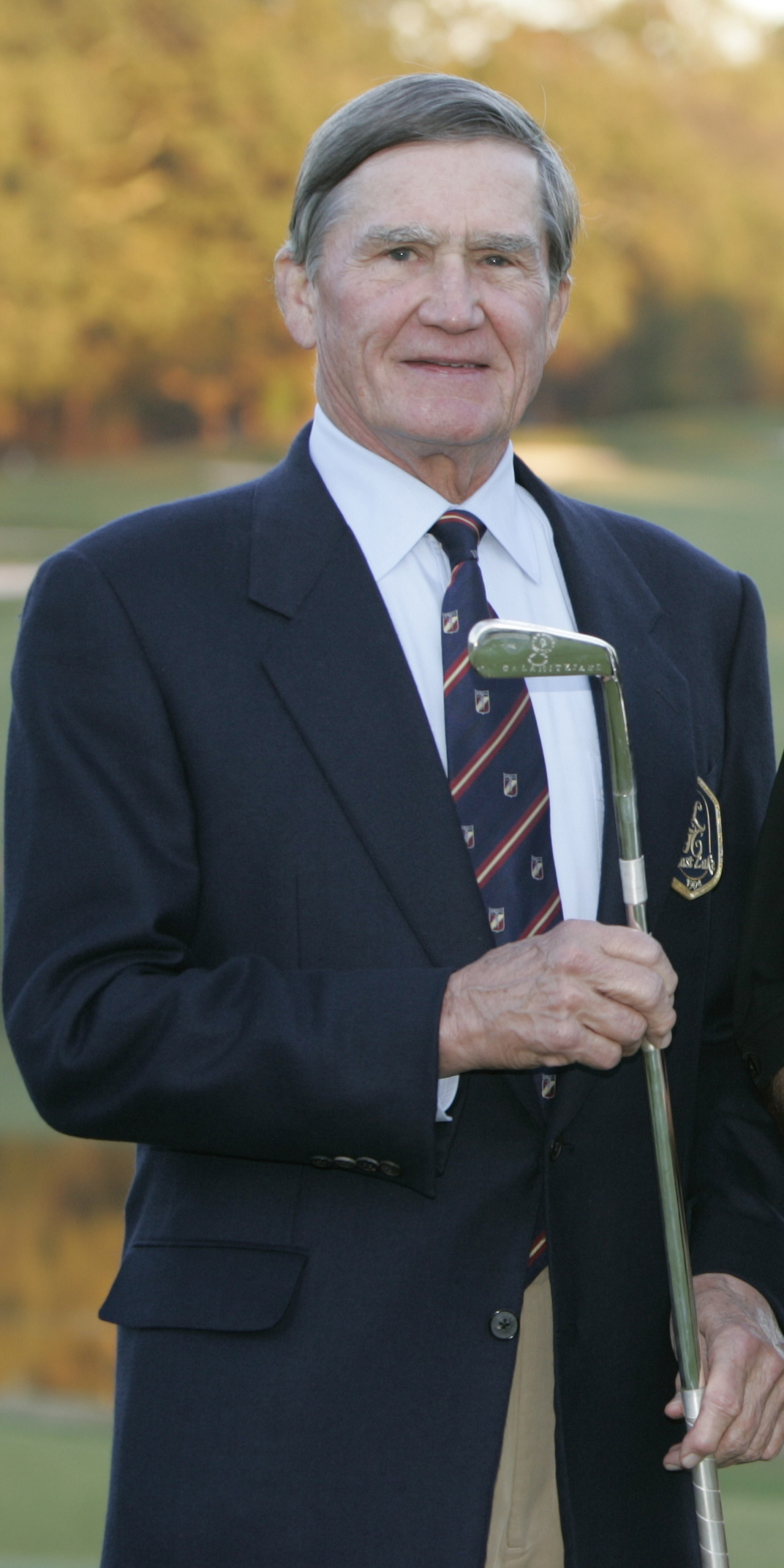
Tom Cousins, real estate developer and philanthropist whose model of community redevelopment is being implemented in cities all over the country through a non-profit program he founded with Warren Buffett called Purpose Built Communities

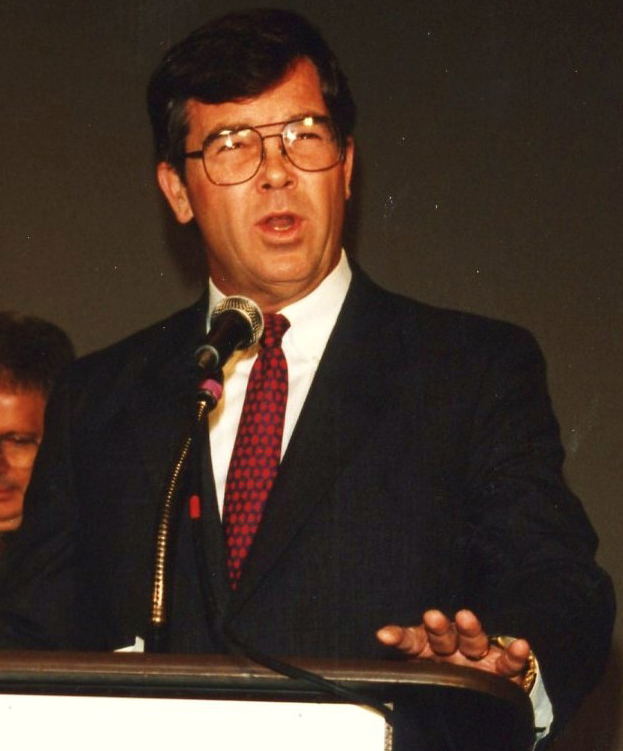
Billy Payne, former president and CEO of the Atlanta Committee for the Olympic Games and responsible for bringing the 1996 Summer Olympics to Atlanta, Georgia; managing director at New York-based investment bank Gleacher & Company; vice chairman of Bank of America and other companies; member of the board of directors of Lincoln National Corporation and other companies

- Daniel P. "Dan" Amos, named one of America's Best CEOs by Institutional Investor magazine five times, chairman and chief executive officer of Aflac, a Fortune 500 company on Fortune magazine's list of the Best Companies to Work for in America and Most Admired Companies, also listed as an Ethisphere Institute World's Most Ethical Company every year since the inception of the award
- Jeff Arnold, Internet entrepreneur and media proprietor; given Blumenthal Award by Johns Hopkins University in recognition of his ability to bridge business and technology, founder of WebMD, health platform Sharecare with Mehmet Oz; chairman and CEO of HowStuffWorks
- Tope Awotona, tech entrepreneur, founder of the software company Calendly
- D.W. Brooks, founder and chairman emeritus of Gold Kist
- M. Michele Burns, board member of Wal-Mart, Cisco Systems and Goldman Sachs
- Maxine Clark, corporate officer at Hecht's, a division of the May Company department store chain, president of Payless Shoe Source, founder of Build A Bear Workshop
- A.D. "Pete" Correll, chairman of Atlanta Equity, chairman emeritus of Georgia-Pacific, director of SunTrust Bank (now Truist Financial), Mirant and Norfolk Southern
- Tom Cousins, founder of Cousins Properties and philanthropist whose model of community redevelopment is being implemented in cities all over the country through a non-profit program he founded with Warren Buffett called Purpose Built Communities
- Gina Drosos, multimillionaire president of the global beauty care division of Procter & Gamble, chief executive officer of Signet Jewelers Ltd., the world's largest retailer of diamond jewelry
- Frank Hanna III, entrepreneur, philanthropist and merchant banker; Knight of the Grand Cross of the Order of St. Gregory the Great by Pope Benedict XVI and described as "one of the leading Catholic philanthropists in the USA"
- Mason Hawkins, value investor and founder of Southeastern Asset Management, Inc.
- Ron Holt, founder and CEO of Two Maids & A Mop
- Douglas Ivester, served as the chairman and chief executive officer of The Coca-Cola Company, board member Truist Financial, honored with Edison Achievement Award
- David Kramer, co-president of United Talent Agency
- Julius Curtis Lewis Jr., president of J.C. Lewis Enterprises and Lewis Broadcasting Corp., owner of numerous automobile dealerships, media outlets (including both a TV and radio stations), and commercial real estate properties
- Hala Moddelmog, president of Church's Chicken and Susan G. Komen for the Cure
- Billy Payne, former president and CEO of the Atlanta Committee for the Olympic Games and responsible for bringing the 1996 Summer Olympics to Atlanta, Georgia; managing director at New York-based investment bank Gleacher & Company; vice chairman of Bank of America and other companies; member of the board of directors of Lincoln National Corporation and other companies
- Thomas J. Stanley, The New York Times best-selling author of The Millionaire Next Door and The Millionaire Mind

=== Economics and finance ===
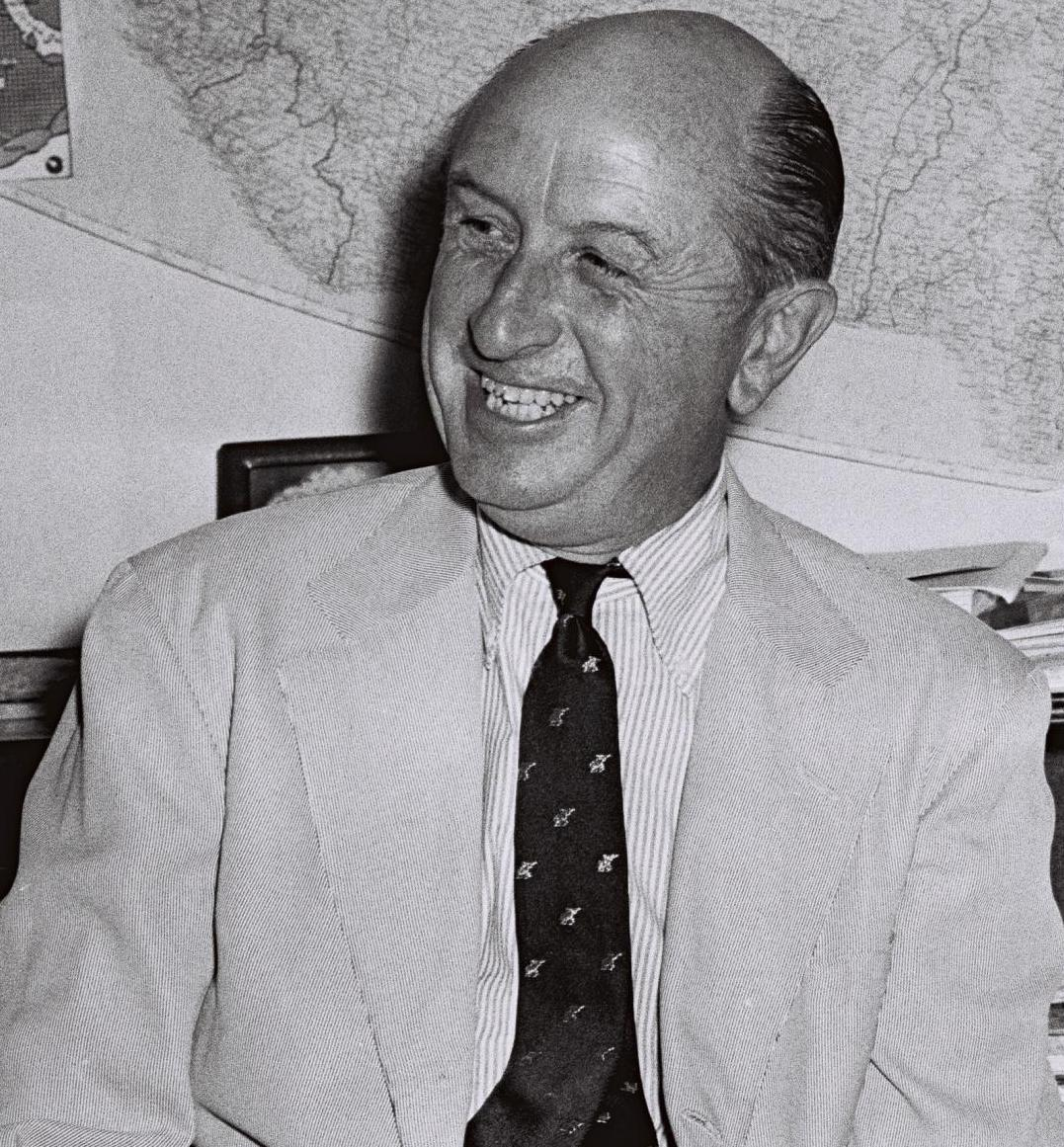
Eugene R. Black Sr. was president of the World Bank, chairman of the Brookings Institution, special adviser to the president on Southeast Asian Social and Economic Development, honorary Doctor of Laws from Princeton University, and chair of the Peabody Award Board of Jurors

- Eugene Robert Black, chairman of the Federal Reserve
- Eugene R. Black Sr. former president of the World Bank, chairman of the Brookings Institution, special adviser to the president on Southeast Asian Social and Economic Development, board member of multiple corporations and foundations, honorary Doctor of Laws from Princeton University, chair of the Peabody Award Board of Jurors
- Reta Jo Lewis, president of the Export-Import Bank of the United States
- Robert D. McTeer, president of the Federal Reserve Bank of Dallas
- Bernard Ramsey, senior vice president and chairman of the executive committee of Merrill Lynch
- Charles S. Sanford Jr., chairman of the board and chief executive officer of Bankers Trust

=== Educators ===
- Kimberly Ballard-Washington, president of Savannah State University, 2019–2023
- Cornelia Bargmann, neurobiologist whose awards included the Kavli Prize, the Breakthrough Prize in Life Sciences, and the Gruber Prize in Neuroscience; Wiesel Professor of Genetics and Neurosciences at Rockefeller University known for her work in biochemistry, cancer systems biology, and neurobiology
- Cynthia Baum, clinical psychologist and academic administrator
- Deborah Blum, Pulitzer Prize-winning journalist; professor and director of the Knight Science Journalism program at the Massachusetts Institute of Technology
- Ertharin Cousin, named to the TIME 100 most influential people in the world list, Payne Distinguished Professor at Stanford University's Freeman Spogli Institute for International Studies
- Richard Cusimano, historian, Distinguished Professor at the University of Louisiana at Lafayette
- Leonard DeLonga, sculptor, painter, and professor at Mount Holyoke College
- Mary Frances Early, first African-American graduate of UGA; the College of Education was renamed in her honor in 2020
- Marion Ross Fedrick, president of Albany State University, 2018–present
- Daisy Hurst Floyd, law professor, dean of the Walter F. George School of Law of Mercer University
- Tomlinson Fort Jr., head of chemical engineering, Carnegie-Mellon and Vanderbilt University; formerly provost and vice president of California Polytechnic State University
- Edgar Fuller, current professor in the department of mathematics and statistics at Florida International University
- Richard Gershon, current dean of the University of Mississippi School of Law
- Fredrick C. Harris, professor of political science and dean of social science at Columbia University, winner of a 2013 Hurston/Wright Legacy Award
- Wilson A. Head, sociologist, professor of social work and sociology at York University, activist in race relations, peace and the abolition of prisons
- Karen Holbrook, president of Ohio State University
- Solomon Hughes, educator
- Robert J. Jones, former chancellor of the University of Illinois at Urbana-Champaign, president of the University of Washington
- Cynthia Kenyon, professor of biochemistry, biophysics, University of California, San Francisco, member of National Academy of Sciences
- Hilde Lindemann, philosophy professor, bioethicist, currently teaching at Michigan State University
- Bjørn Lomborg, Danish author, professor, and president of the think tank Copenhagen Consensus Center
- Michael McClelland, professor of Microbiology and Genetics at the University of California, Irvine
- Robert D. McTeer, former chancellor of the Texas A&M University System
- Marion Montgomery, poet, novelist, educator, and critic
- Delia Owens, author and zoologist; authored several internationally bestselling nonfiction books in her field; taught and lectured throughout North America
- George Foster Pierce, president of Wesleyan College and Emory University
- Letitia Dowdell Ross (1866–1952), educator at State Normal College (now Jacksonville State University, Jacksonville, Alabama), Martin Female College (Pulaski, Tennessee), and North Texas Female College (Sherman, Texas); leader of women's organizations
- Michael G. Scales, president of Nyack College and Alliance Theological Seminary in New York City
- Beth Shapiro, MacArthur Fellow and National Academy of Sciences evolutionary molecular biology professor and Howard Hughes Medical Institute investigator
- Garnett Sue Stokes, president of the University of New Mexico, former provost for Florida State University and the University of Missouri
- William Tate, graduate work at Columbia University, Harvard University and the University of Chicago, English professor, dean
- Dina Titus, United States representative for Nevada's 1st congressional district since 2013, previously U.S. representative for Nevada's 3rd congressional district 2009–2011, and professor of political science at the University of Nevada, Las Vegas
- John Newton Waddel, former chancellor of the University of Mississippi
- Jim Whittenburg (born 1946), professor of history at the College of William & Mary
- Melanie D. Wilson, dean of Washington and Lee University School of Law
- Daniel Asua Wubah, president of Millersville University of Pennsylvania
- Sally Quillian Yates, faculty at Georgetown University Law Center, former United States deputy attorney general and acting United States attorney general

=== Government and the law ===
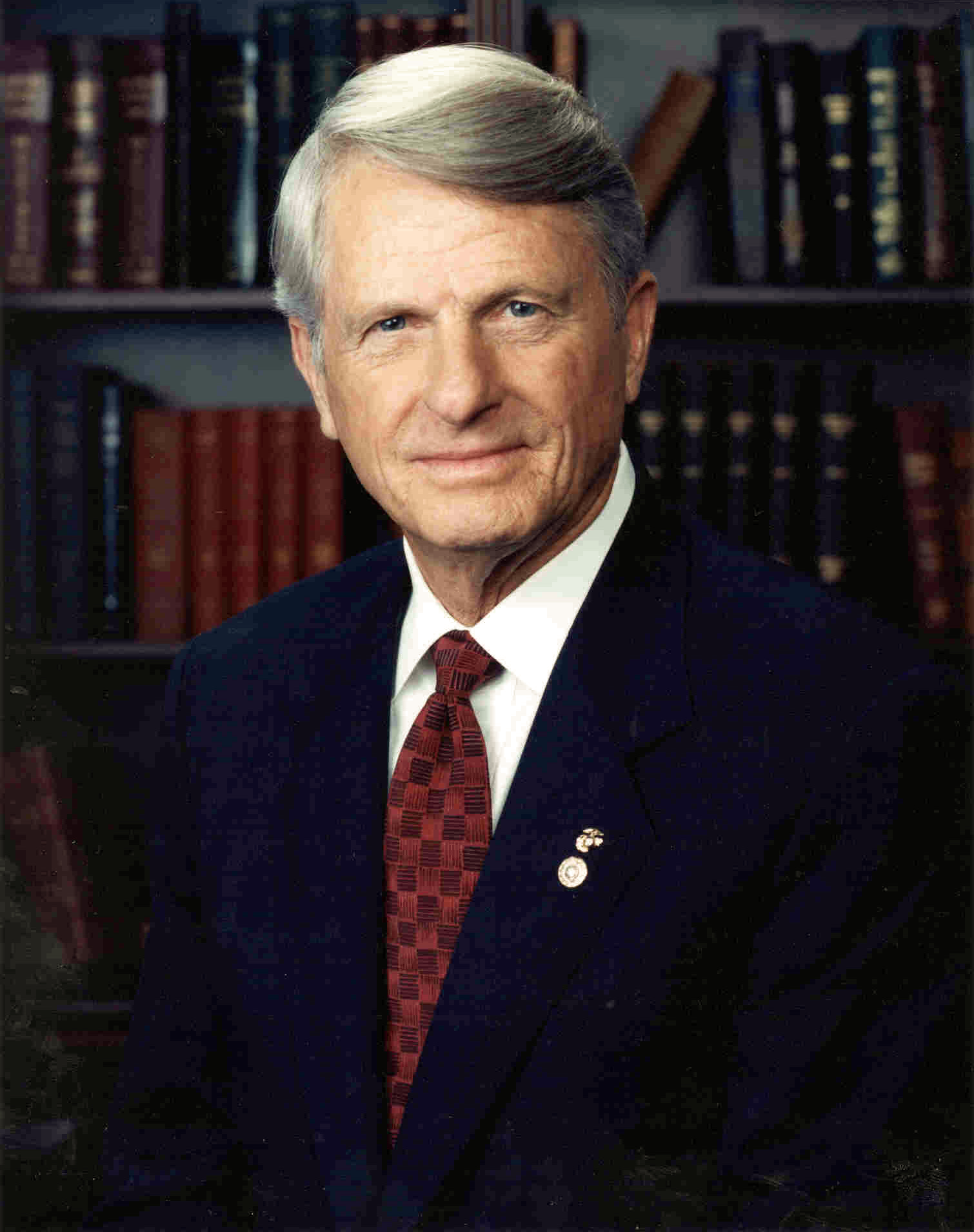
Former Governor Zell Miller was founder of the HOPE Scholarship.

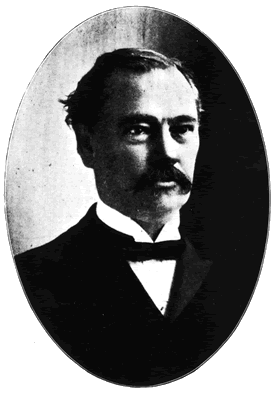
Former Governor Nathaniel Harris was the founder of Georgia Institute of Technology.

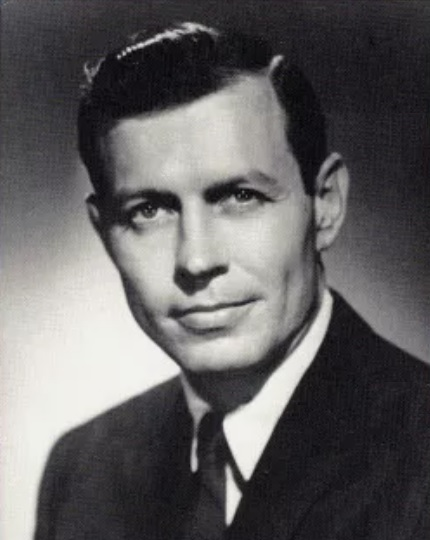
Former Governor Carl Sanders, a founder and chairman of Troutman Sanders international law firm

- Samuel B. Adams, justice of the Supreme Court of Georgia
- Abdul Karim al-Iryani, prime minister of Yemen
- Diane Marie Amann, Woodruff Chair in International Law at UGA, appointee to International Criminal Court Prosecutor as advisor on children in and affected by armed conflict
- Ellis Arnall, governor of Georgia
- William Yates Atkinson, governor of Georgia
- Roy Barnes, governor of Georgia, Georgia senator, Georgia House of Representatives member, volunteer at Atlanta Legal Aid Society, Inc., and partner of Barnes Law Group; credited for the removal of the Confederate rebel flag from the flag of Georgia
- John Barrow, former member of United States House of Representatives
- Robert Benham, first African-American chief justice of the Supreme Court of Georgia
- William Tapley Bennett Jr., US ambassador to the Dominican Republic, Portugal and NATO
- Cecile Bledsoe, member of the Arkansas State Senate, formerly represented two different districts in the Arkansas House of Representatives
- Darrell Blocker, nicknamed "The Spy Whisperer", CIA agent
- Dudley Hollingsworth Bowen Jr., senior United States District Court Judge
- Charles Bronson, Florida commissioner of Agriculture and Consumer Services
- Clifford Cleveland Brooks, member of the Louisiana State Senate 1924–1932, represented the northeast delta parishes
- Garland T. Byrd, lieutenant governor of Georgia
- Albert Sidney Camp, politician, educator and lawyer
- John Archibald Campbell, U.S. Supreme Court justice
- Saxby Chambliss, former U.S. senator
- Joyce Chandler, former educator and member of the Georgia House of Representatives
- Chee Soon Juan (徐顺全), Singaporean neuropsychologist, politician and leader of the Singapore Democratic Party
- Howell Cobb, governor of Georgia and US representative, speaker of the House in 31st Congress
- Ertharin Cousin, lawyer, twelfth Executive Director of the United Nations World Food Programme
- Cathy Cox, former secretary of state of Georgia, dean of Mercer University Law School
- Ander Crenshaw, member of the U.S. House of Representatives
- Benjamin Cromwell Franklin, first judicial officeholder in the Republic of Texas
- Heidi Davison, former mayor of Athens, Georgia
- William Crosby Dawson, U.S. senator, judge, politician
- Nancy Denson, mayor of Athens-Clarke County, Georgia
- Norman S. Fletcher, Georgia State Supreme Court chief justice
- Alva Garey, former Republican member of the Wisconsin State Senate
- John B. Gordon, general in Confederate Army, U.S. Senator, governor of Georgia
- Phil Gramm, former U.S. senator from Texas
- Tom Graves, U.S. representative for Georgia's 9th congressional district
- Marjorie Taylor Greene, U.S. representative for Georgia's 14th congressional district
- Joe Frank Harris, governor of Georgia, credited for the construction of the Georgia Dome, creating the Technical College System of Georgia and bringing the 1996 Summer Olympics to Atlanta
- Nathaniel E. Harris, governor of Georgia, founder of Georgia Institute of Technology
- Sampson Willis Harris, former U.S. congressman for the 3rd and 7th districts of Alabama
- Young L.G. Harris, state representative, federal judge
- Edith E. House, one of the first female Georgia Law graduates, United States attorney for Southern District of Florida, namesake of a lecture series at Georgia Law
- Mike Hubbard, member of the Alabama House of Representatives
- Hank Huckaby, member, Georgia House of Representatives and chancellor of the University System of Georgia
- Guy G. Hurlbutt, United States attorney for Idaho 1981–1984; former federal judicial nominee to the United States Court of Appeals for the Ninth Circuit
- Ben F. Johnson, member of the Georgia State Senate; authored the MARTA Act; dean of the Emory University School of Law and the Georgia State University College of Law
- Herschel Vespasian Johnson, state governor, U.S. senator, and candidate for Vice president of the United States
- James Johnson, state governor and member, United States House of Representatives
- Hamilton Jordan, politician and presidential chief of staff
- Brian P. Kemp, state governor, former state secretary of state
- Jack Kingston, member, United States House of Representatives
- George H. Kreeger, member of Georgia House of Representatives, 1969–1976; state judge, 1979–2012
- Benjamin Land, justice of the Supreme Court of Georgia
- Henderson Lovelace Lanham, member, United States House of Representatives
- Reta Jo Lewis, attorney, diplomat, politician, served as president of the Export-Import Bank of the United States
- Nancy Mace, U.S. representative from South Carolina
- Juanita Marsh, third female judge in Georgia, 2020 Georgia Women of Achievement inductee
- Sam Massell, 53rd mayor of Atlanta; first Jewish mayor in the city's history
- John Milledge, state governor, U.S. senator and US representative
- Zell Miller, U.S. senator, governor of Georgia, and founder of the HOPE Scholarship
- Eugene Mitchell, lawyer and politician; served as the president of the Atlanta Board of Education; father of Margaret Mitchell
- Colton Moore, youngest presumptive member of the Georgia House of Representatives for District 1, 2019–2021; Georgia Auctioneer Champion 2016
- Brooks Pennington Jr., member of the Georgia House of Representatives and Georgia State Senate, author, businessman, philanthropist
- George E. Perdue III, U.S. secretary of agriculture, governor, member of Governors' Council of the Bipartisan Policy Center, businessman
- Ralph Reed, conservative activist and former candidate for lieutenant governor of Georgia
- Steve Reick, Illinois state representative
- Fred B. Rooney, US representative from Pennsylvania
- Richard Russell Jr., governor of Georgia, U.S. senator, and president pro tempore of the United States Senate
- William J. Samford, 31st governor of Alabama
- Carl Sanders, governor of Georgia, a founder and chairman Troutman Sanders international law firm
- John Marshall Slaton, governor of Georgia
- Alexander Stephens, governor of Georgia, U.S. representative, called for the South to remain loyal to the Union, but later vice president of the Confederate States of America
- Eugene Talmadge, governor of Georgia
- Herman Talmadge, governor of Georgia and U.S. Senator
- Mark Taylor, lieutenant governor of Georgia
- Meldrim Thomson Jr., three-term governor of New Hampshire
- Melvin E. Thompson, governor of Georgia
- Dina Titus, the United States representative for Nevada's 1st congressional district since 2013, previously U.S. representative for Nevada's 3rd congressional district 2009–2011, and professor of political science at the University of Nevada, Las Vegas
- Lynne M. Tracy, diplomat including United States Ambassador to Russia
- Ernest Vandiver, governor of Georgia
- Samuel Franklin Wilson (1845–1923), Confederate veteran, Tennessee state representative and senator, judge
- Sally Caroline Yates, lawyer, served as a United States attorney, later United States deputy attorney general, later as acting United States attorney general

=== Media and journalism ===
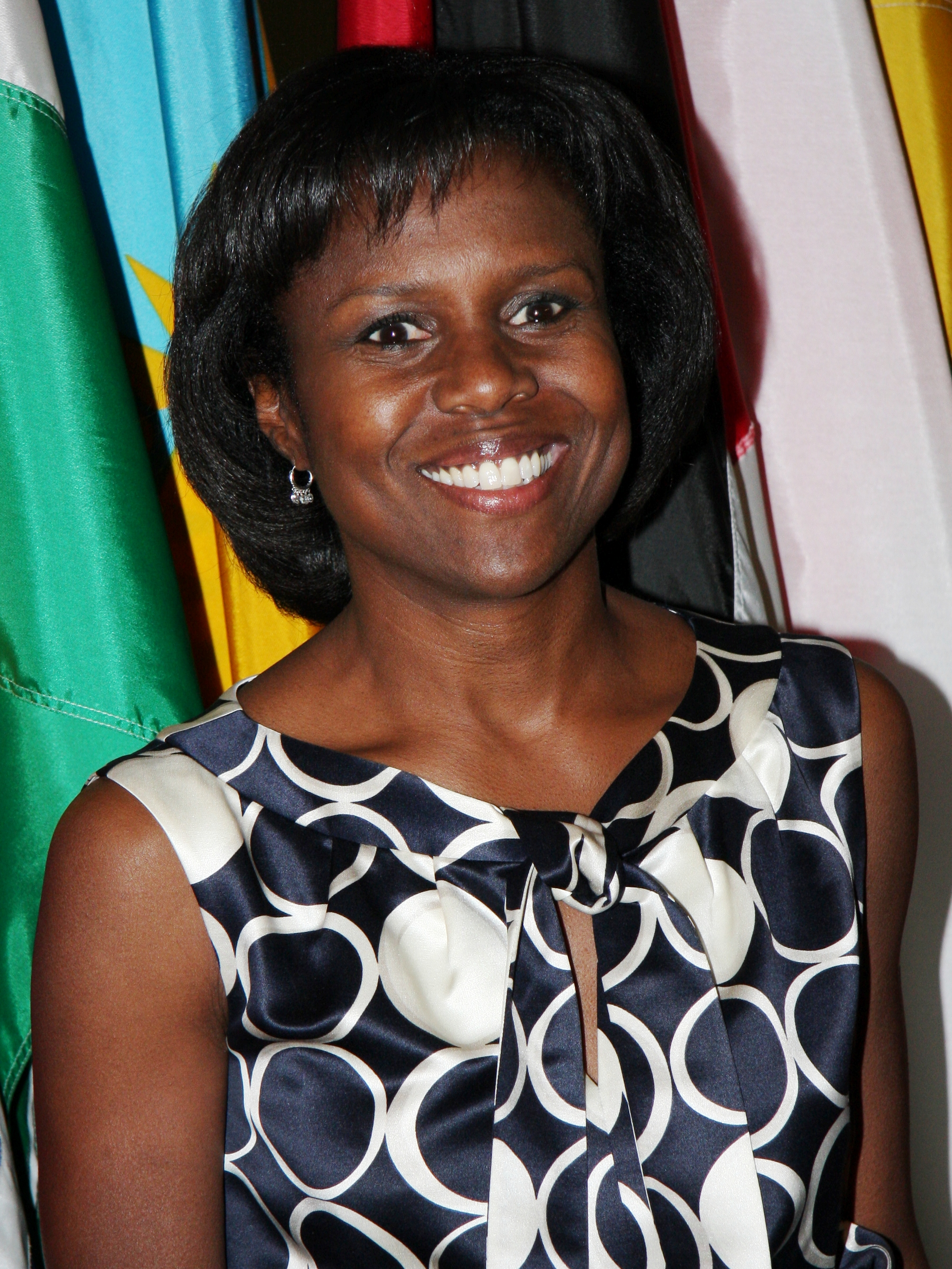
Deborah Roberts, host of ABC's Good Morning America, and Emmy and Peabody Award winner

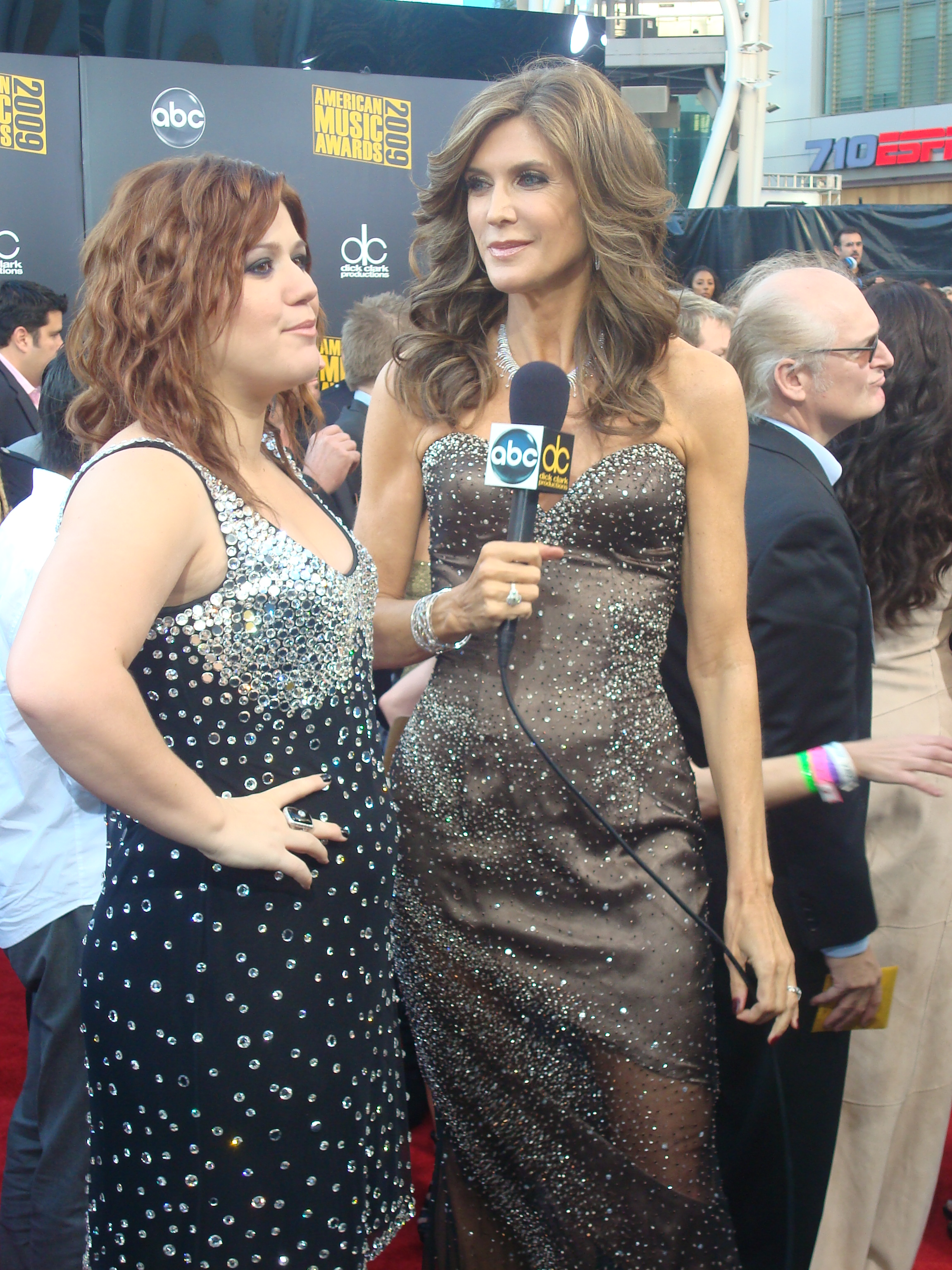
Entertainment Tonight host Julie Moran and singer Kelly Clarkson at the 2009 American Music Awards

- Brooke Anderson, news anchor and producer for CNN
- Deborah Blum, Pulitzer Prize-winning author, journalist, science writer and professor at Massachusetts Institute of Technology
- Jim Callis, executive editor at Baseball America
- Chip Caray, professional baseball announcer
- Mike Edwards, journalist, writer, and senior editor for National Geographic
- Joel Furr, columnist, Usenet personality, first person to use the term "spam" to describe unwanted mass electronic messages
- Henry W. Grady, journalist and orator; Grady Memorial Hospital, Henry W. Grady College of Journalism and Mass Communication and Henry W. Grady High School are named in his honor
- Ed Grisamore, author, journalist; recipient of the 2010 Will Rogers Humanitarian Award presented by the National Society of Newspaper Columnists
- Lewis Grizzard, author, humorist, columnist for The Atlanta Journal-Constitution and sports editor for the Chicago Sun-Times
- Mary Katharine Ham, journalist, political commentator and video blogger, guest host The View, CNN and Fox News Channel contributor
- John Holliman, broadcast journalist with CNN, known for his coverage of space exploration and reporting during the Persian Gulf War, NASA dedicated Launch Complex 39 Press Site facility at the Kennedy Space Center to him
- Clark Howell, Pulitzer Prize-winning newspaperman and journalist
- Charlayne Hunter-Gault, Emmy Award- and Peabody Award-winning journalist and news correspondent; author; international journalist and broadcaster for The New York Times, The New Yorker, WRC-TV, CNN, NPR, PBS, and The MacNeil/Lehrer Report; one of the first two African-Americans to be admitted to the university; the Holmes-Hunter academic building is named after her and Hamilton Holmes, M.D.; first African-American admitted to Emory University School of Medicine
- Ernie Johnson Jr. (A.B.J. 1978), sports broadcaster for TNT and TBS
- W. Thomas Johnson, chairman, president, and CEO of CNN; former president, publisher, and CEO of Los Angeles Times, former press agent and personal aid to U.S. President Lyndon B. Johnson, member Peabody Awards Board of Jurors, Walter Cronkite Award for Excellence in Journalism
- Suzanne Lambert, political commentator, internet personality, and comedian
- Connie LeGrand, television journalist in South Carolina; former host of Speed News
- Pat Mitchell, media industry CEO, producer, professor, and author; has taught at the University of Georgia and at Harvard University's John F. Kennedy School of Government, worked at NBC (where she was the first woman to produce and host a national program), CNN, PBS, TED conferences, awarded a Lifetime Achievement Award by Women's Media Center, the Sandra Day O'Connor Award for Leadership, the Bodley Medal from Oxford University, inducted into the Broadcasting Hall of Fame, Council on Foreign Relations, the International Academy of Television Arts and Sciences, and, as producer of documentaries and specials, recipient of 35 Emmy Awards and five Peabody Awards, current president of The Paley Center for Media in New York City
- Julie Moran, host of Entertainment Tonight
- Deborah Norville, television journalist, businessperson, and New York Times best-selling author, hosted Inside Edition, CBS News, Today, NBC News
- Mark B. Perry, television producer, television writer, Primetime Emmy Award winner
- Tom Poland, author and journalist
- Leonard Postero, creator of Leonard's Losers, a syndicated football prognostication radio show
- Ralph Reed, pundit and former director of the Christian Coalition
- Amy Robach, correspondent for ABC News, anchor for Good Morning America, previously national correspondent for NBC News, co-host of the Saturday edition of NBC's Today, MSNBC anchor
- Deborah Roberts, ABC News producer and journalist, Emmy Award, Clarion Award, and Peabody Award winner
- Mark Schlabach, ESPN college football and basketball columnist, formerly of The Atlanta Journal-Constitution and The Washington Post
- Parvati Shallow, Survivor: Micronesia winner
- Alice Stewart, political commentator for CNN, Emmy Award winner, Communications Director for presidential campaigns, a Harvard Fellow at the John F. Kennedy School of Government
- Tommy Tomlinson, columnist for The Charlotte Observer; finalist for the 2005 Pulitzer Prize for Commentary
- Raquel Willis, writer and transgender rights activist

=== Medicine ===
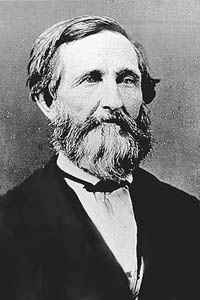
Crawford Long, the inventor of anesthesia

- Alfred Blalock, chief of surgery, professor, and director of the department of surgery of Johns Hopkins School of Medicine; ushered in the modern era of cardiac surgery; winner of the Albert Lasker Clinical Medical Research Award and nominated several times for the Nobel Prize in Medicine; namesake of Alfred Blalock Clinical Sciences Building at Johns Hopkins Hospital
- Paul Broun, physician and U.S. congressman
- Hervey M. Cleckley, psychiatrist pioneer in the field of psychopathy whose book Mask of Sanity, was the most influential clinical description of psychopathy in the twentieth century, co-author of The Three Faces of Eve
- William Harrell Felton, politician, army surgeon, and Methodist minister
- Hamilton E. Holmes, orthopedist, professor and associate dean of Emory University School of Medicine
- Fady Joudah, physician and poet
- Alec Kessler, orthopedic surgeon and former basketball player for the Miami Heat
- Crawford Long, surgeon and pharmacist best known for his first use of inhaled diethyl ether as an anesthetic
- Barbara Rothbaum, psychologist, professor at Emory University School of Medicine, and pioneer in the treatment of anxiety-related disorders; played a key role in the development of the treatment of posttraumatic stress disorder (PTSD)
- J. Roy Rowland, physician and politician

=== Military ===
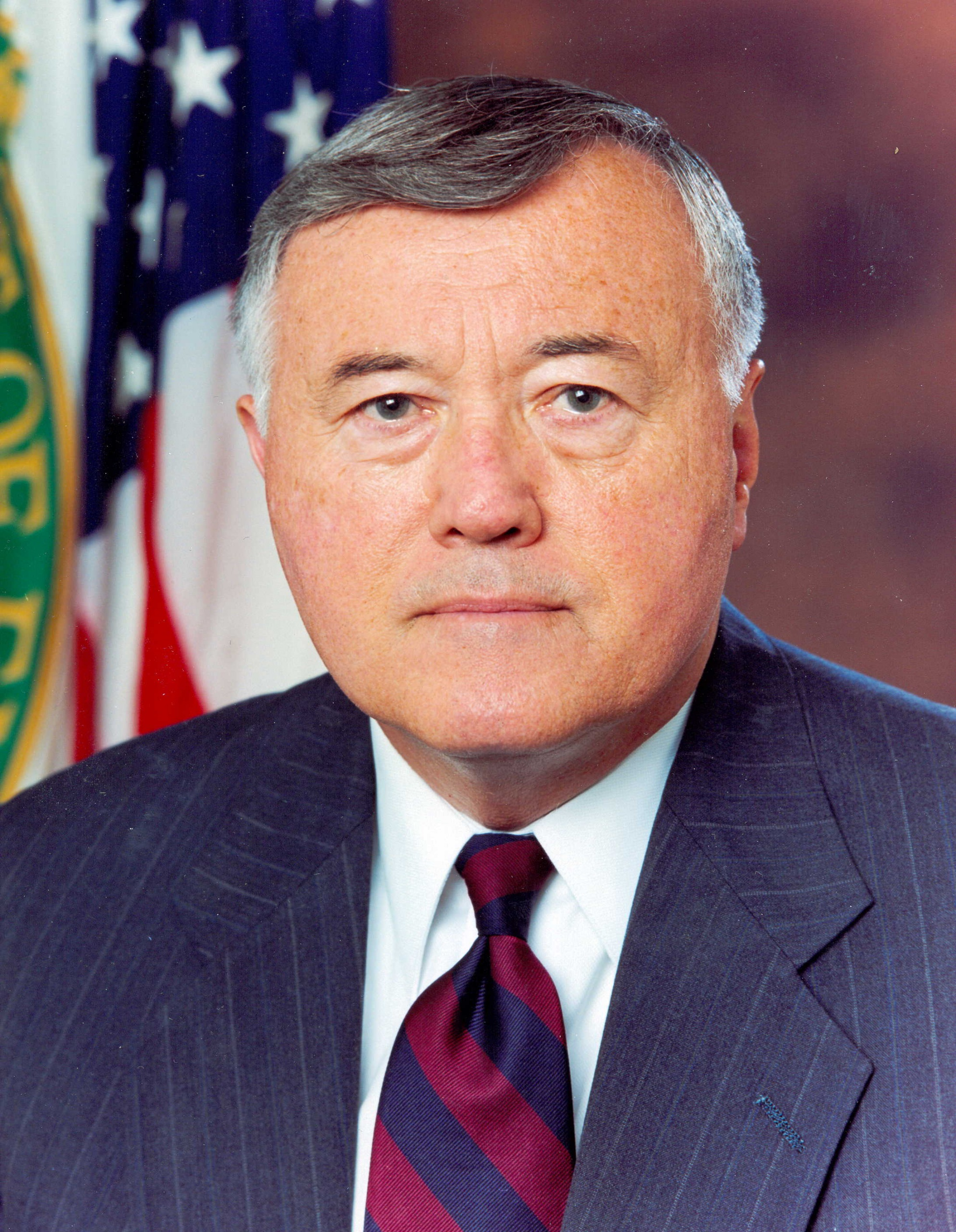
Eugene E. Habiger, United States Air Force four-star general who served as commander in chief, United States Strategic Command, sirector of Security and Emergency Operations, U.S. Department of Energy

- William P. Acker, major general in the Air Force
- Charles A. Beckwith, credited with the creation of the counter-terrorism special forces unit Delta Force; author of Delta Force: The Army's Elite Counterterrorist Unit
- Lloyd D. Brown, United States Army major general, commanded the 28th Infantry Division in World War II
- Bobby Christine, 43rd Judge Advocate General of the United States Army
- Erle Cocke Jr., Silver Star recipient, 33rd National Commander of the American Legion (1950–51)
- John B. Gordon, general in Confederate Army, US senator, governor of Georgia
- Ronald H. Griffith, retired United States Army four-star general, served as vice chief of staff of the United States Army
- Eugene E. Habiger, United States Air Force four-star general, served as commander in chief, United States Strategic Command (USCINCSTRAT), director of Security and Emergency Operations, U.S. Department of Energy
- James R. Lockett, awarded two Silver Stars during the Spanish–American War; World War II Camp Lockett was named in his honor
- Jack L. Rives, 15th Judge Advocate General of the Air Force
- David N. Senty, major general in the Air Force, former chief of staff of United States Cyber Command
- Michael D. Steele, former commander of 3rd Brigade, 101st Airborne Division, veteran of the Battle of Mogadishu and Operation Iraqi Freedom
- Luis R. Visot, major general in the United States Army, former chief of staff of United States Army Reserve

=== Ministry and religion ===
- Isaac P. Mendes, rabbi
- Benjamin M. Palmer, writer and theologian, first national moderator of Presbyterian Church, professor at Amherst College and Columbia Theological Seminary, longtime pastor of First Presbyterian of New Orleans (1856–1902)
- George Foster Pierce, bishop of the Methodist Episcopal Church, South, president of Wesleyan College and Emory University
- David Platt, pastor and author of the New York Times best seller Radical

=== Scientific research ===
- Wyatt Anderson, geneticist, professor of genetics at University of Georgia, Alumni Foundation Distinguished Professor, member of the National Academy of Sciences, Fellow of American Academy of Arts and Sciences, Fellow of American Association for the Advancement of Science
- Cornelia Bargmann, neurobiologist, Wiesel Professor of Genetics and Neurosciences at the Rockefeller University, investigator at Howard Hughes Medical Institute, president of science at the Chan Zuckerberg Initiative
- Sir David Baulcombe, FRS, British plant scientist and geneticist; post-doctoral fellow 1978–1980, now Professor of Botany at the University of Cambridge
- Alfred Blalock, medical doctor, pioneered heart surgery and performed groundbreaking research on shock
- Eugene T. Booth, Rhodes Scholar, nuclear physicist; member of the historic Columbia University team which made the first demonstration of nuclear fission in the United States; worked on the Manhattan Project
- James E. Boyd, physicist, mathematician, and founder of Scientific Atlanta, part of Cisco
- David F. Clayton, neuroscientist, biochemist, and academic; professor and chair of the Department of Genetics & Biochemistry at Clemson University
- A. Jamie Cuticchia, bioinformatics pioneer with expertise in the fields of genetics, bioinformatics, and genomics; responsible for the collection of the data constituting the human gene map; director of human genome database
- Leonard DeLonga, sculptor, painter, and professor at Mount Holyoke College
- Charles Herty, academic, chemist and businessman; namesake of UGA's Herty Field
- Cynthia Kenyon, professor of biochemistry, biophysics, University of California-San Francisco, member of National Academy of Sciences
- Bjørn Lomborg, Danish author, professor, president of the think tank Copenhagen Consensus Center, former director of the Danish government's Environmental Assessment Institute (EAI), internationally known for his best-selling book The Skeptical Environmentalist
- Eugene Odum, biologist known for his pioneering work on ecosystem ecology, author of the first ecology textbook, Fundamentals of Ecology
- Beth Shapiro, MacArthur Fellow and National Academy of Sciences evolutionary molecular biologist and Howard Hughes Medical Institute investigator
- Kerwin Swint, political scientist and author, known for his research and writing in the fields of political campaigns, mass media, and political history

=== Sports ===
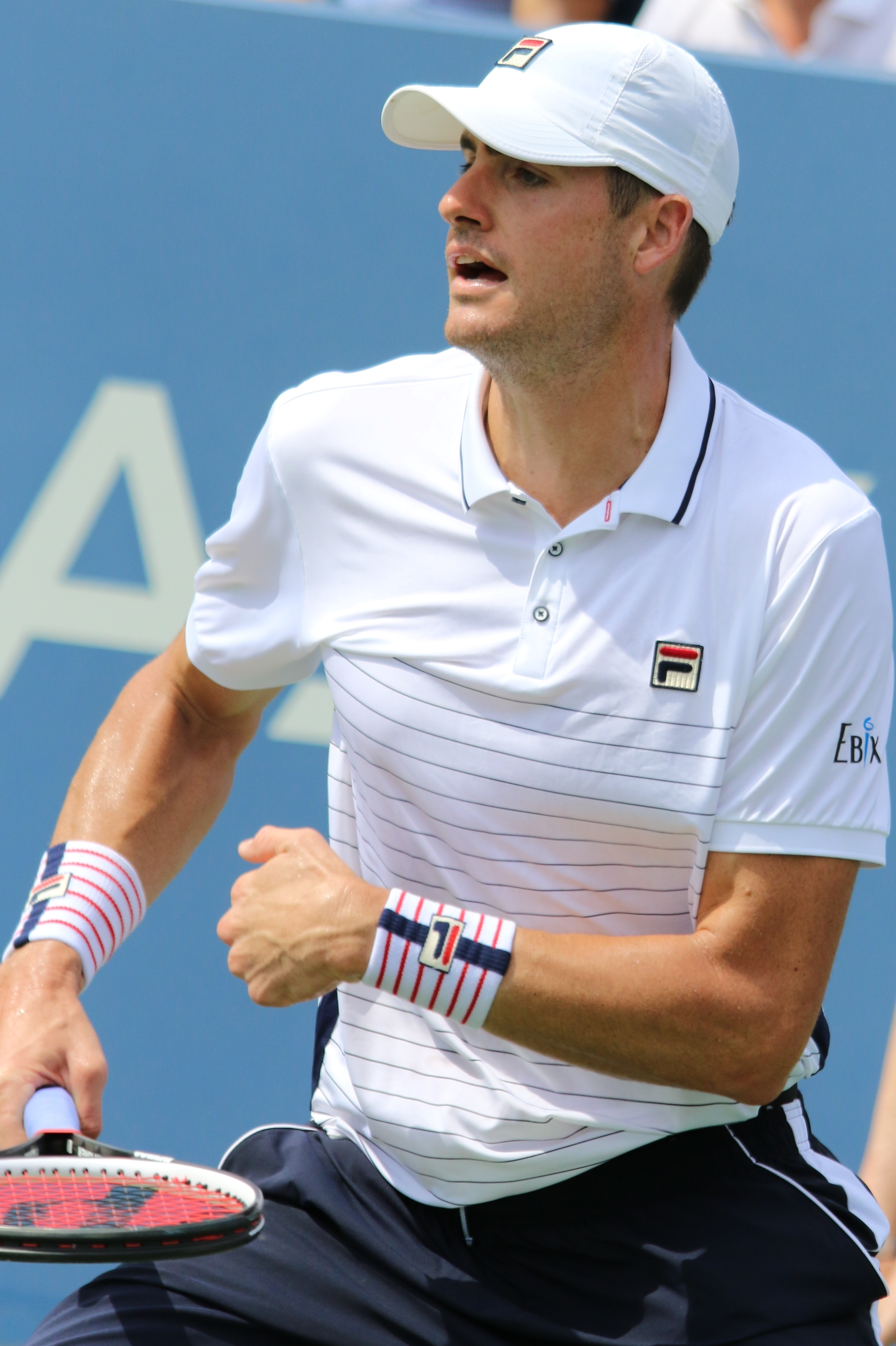
John Isner, professional tennis player with 14 career singles titles

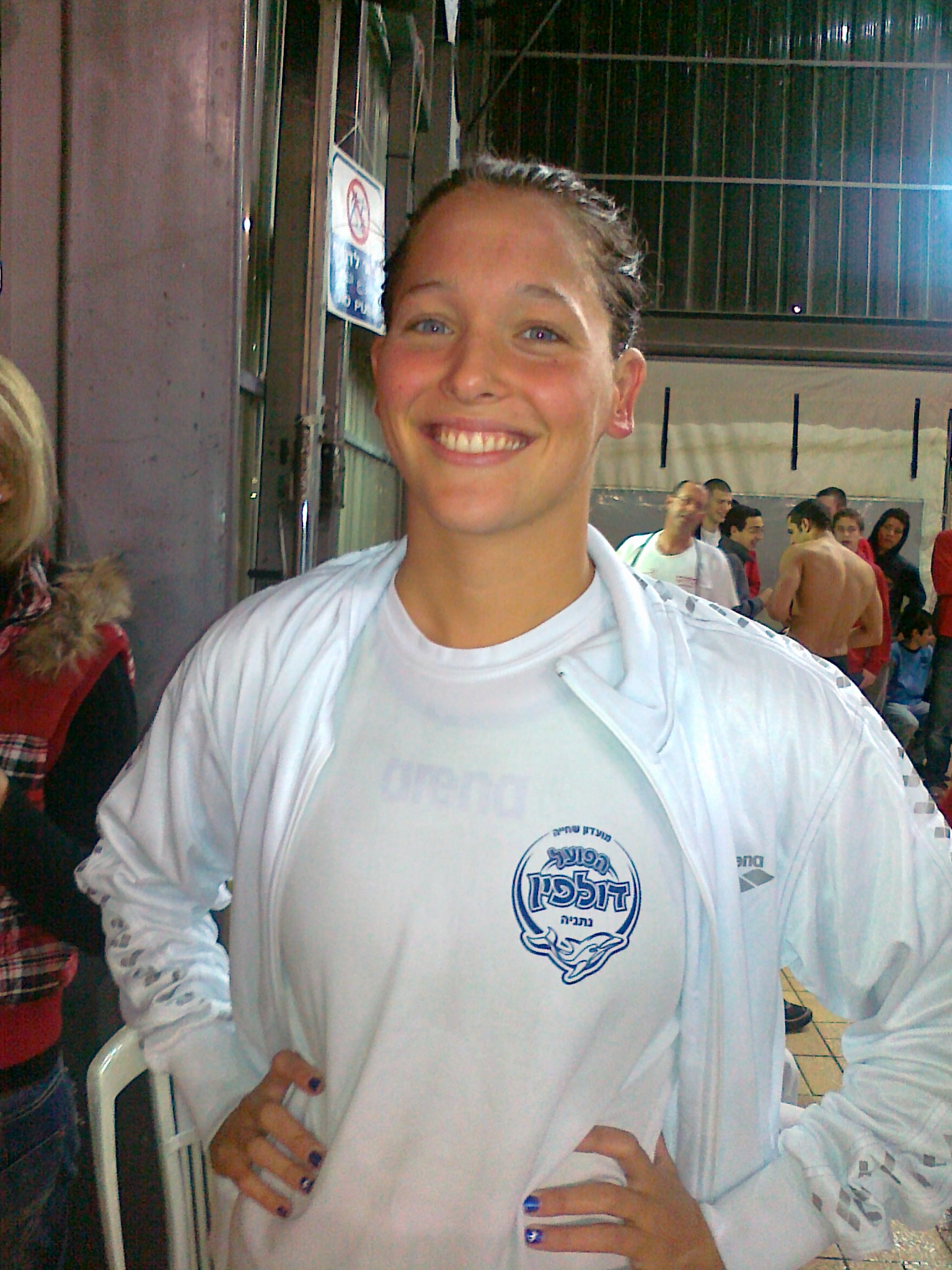
Keren Siebner, Israeli gold medal swimmer

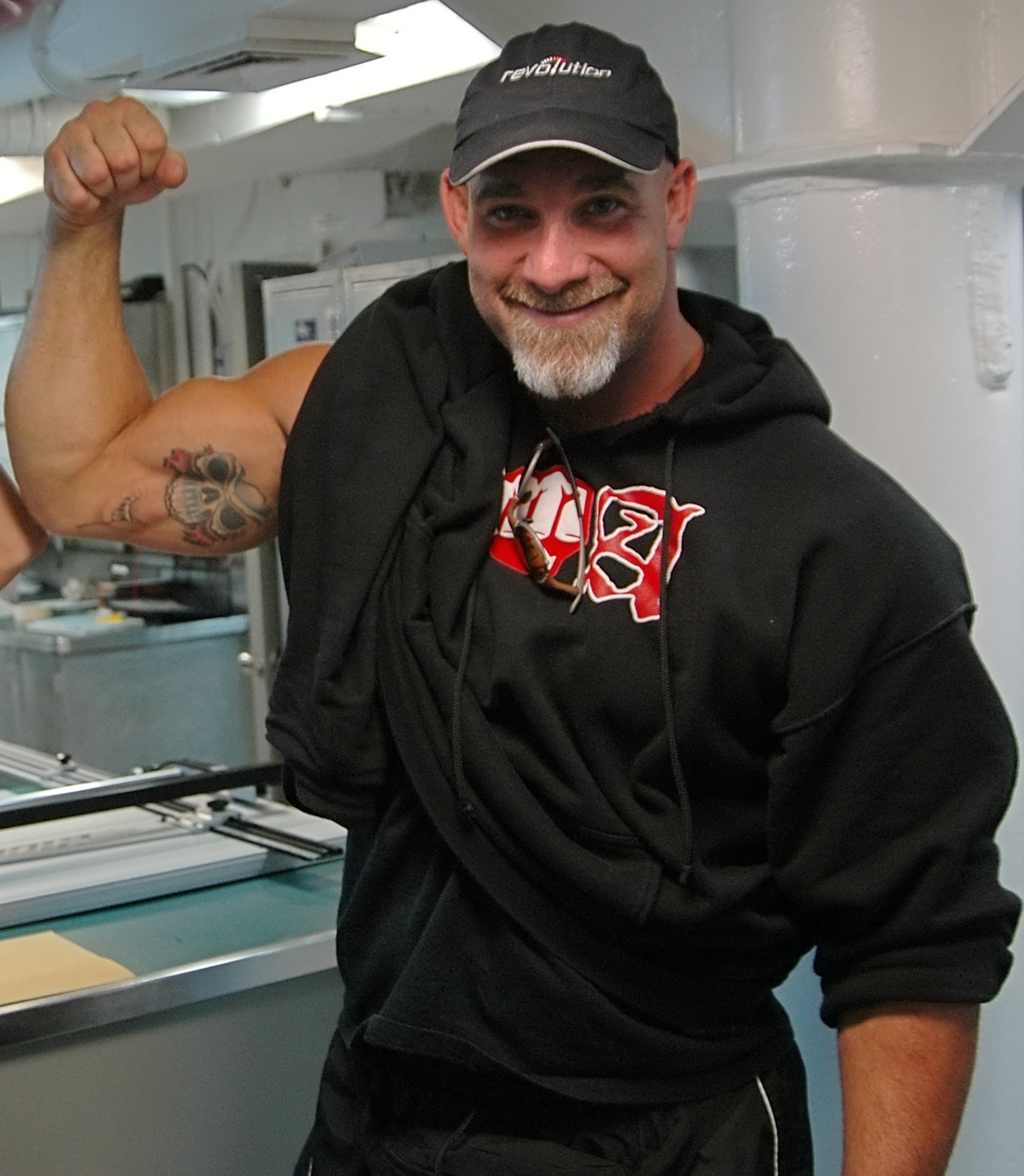
Bill Goldberg, professional wrestler, actor, football player and color commentator

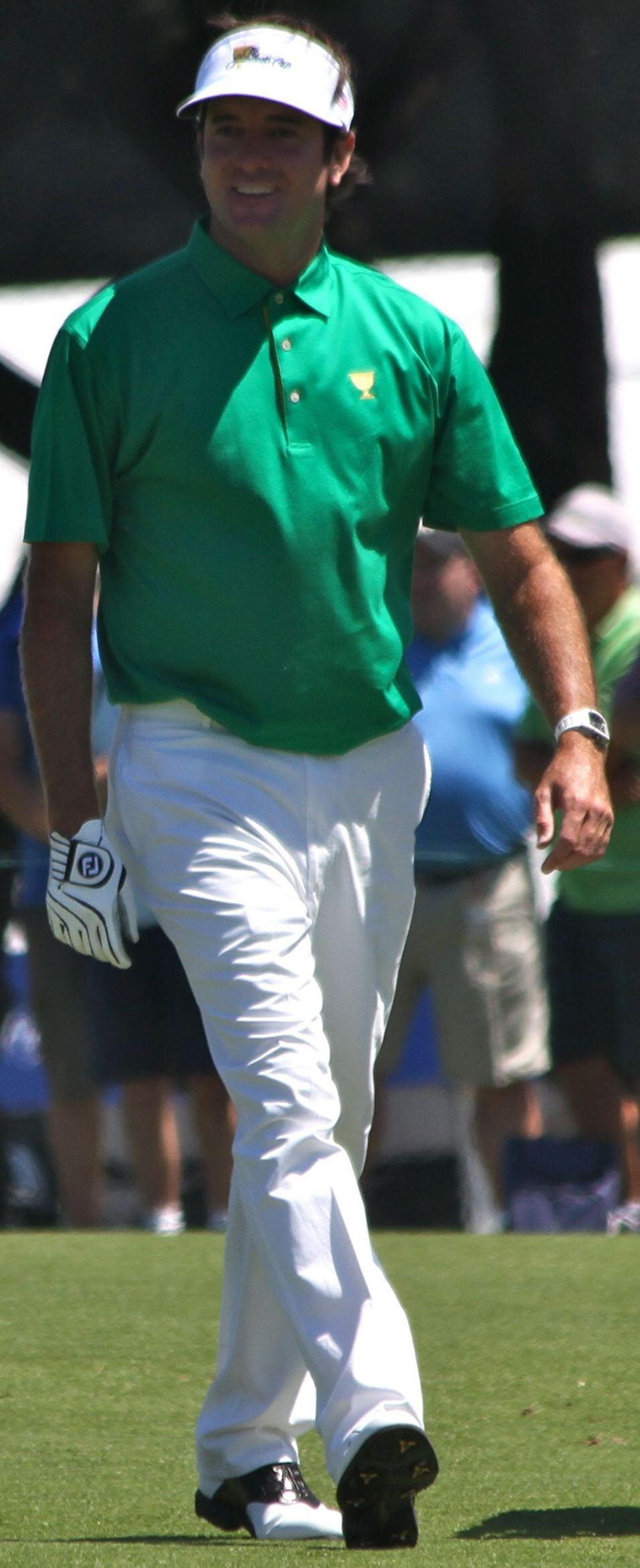
Bubba Watson, won at the Masters Tournament in 2012 and 2014, career-high 2nd place in the Official World Golf Ranking

- Shandon Anderson, NBA
- Boss Bailey, NFL linebacker for the Denver Broncos
- Champ Bailey, NFL cornerback for the Denver Broncos
- Chip Beck, professional golfer, former player on the PGA Tour
- Gordon Beckham, MLB infielder for the Chicago White Sox
- Kendrell Bell, NFL linebacker for the Kansas City Chiefs
- Kim Black, Olympic swimmer, NCAA Woman of the Year in 2001
- Mitchell Boggs, MLB pitcher for the St. Louis Cardinals
- Justin Bolli, player on the PGA Tour
- Kara Braxton, WNBA forward for the Detroit Shock who won two championships
- Bill Brown (did not graduate), college baseball coach of George Mason
- Reggie Brown, NFL wide receiver for the Tampa Bay Buccaneers
- Thomas Brown, professional football coach and former running back
- Kevin Butler, NFL kicker for the Chicago Bears 1985–1995, Super Bowl XX
- Kentavious Caldwell-Pope, current shooting guard for the Los Angeles Lakers; SEC Player of the Year in 2013
- Quincy Carter, NFL quarterback
- Spud Chandler, pitcher for the New York Yankees
- Nick Chubb, 4-Time NFL Pro Bowl electorate, running back for the Cleveland Browns
- Paul Claxton, professional golfer
- Bob Clemens, NFL fullback for the Green Bay Packers
- Erik Compton, professional golfer and two-time heart transplant recipient
- Lisa Coole, swimmer, NCAA Woman of the Year in 1997
- Brandon Coutu, football placekicker, currently a member of the Las Vegas Locomotives of the United Football League
- Terrell Davis, former NFL running back and Super Bowl MVP for the Denver Broncos
- Van Davis, former professional football player
- Todd Duffee, football player; current mixed martial artist for the Ultimate Fighting Championship
- Kris Durham, wide receiver for the Detroit Lions
- Pat Dye, athletic director and football head coach at Auburn University (1981–1992)
- Anthony Edwards, No.1 Pick in 2020 NBA draft, NBA player for Minnesota Timberwolves
- Teresa Edwards, basketball player in the Olympics, the ABL, and the WNBA
- Gene Ellenson, former professional football player
- Harris English, player on the PGA Tour
- Terry Fair (1960–2020), American-Israeli professional basketball player
- Ken Farmer, football player, kicker/punter; injury ended his career in 1986
- Nic Fink, competitive swimmer and engineer
- Vern Fleming, NBA player, taken 18th in the 1984 NBA draft
- Missy Franklin, 2012 Summer Olympic gold medalist
- Robert Geathers, NFL defensive lineman for the Cincinnati Bengals
- Vicki Goetze, player on the LPGA Tour
- Bill Goldberg, NFL football player, and World Heavyweight Champion wrestler in WCW and WWE
- Charles Grant, NFL defensive lineman for the New Orleans Saints
- A. J. Green, wide receiver for the Cincinnati Bengals
- David Greene, drafted in 2005 by the Seattle Seahawks
- Forrest Griffin, mixed-martial artist, former UFC Light Heavyweight Champion; UFC Hall of Fame member; retired
- Todd Gurley
- András Haklits, professional bobsleigher and Olympian
- Bill Hartman Jr., football running back in the National Football League for the Washington Redskins
- Andre Hastings, wide receiver for the Pittsburgh Steelers
- Len Hauss, three-time All Pro; five-time Pro Bowler for the Redskins; president of the NFLPA
- Jarvis Hayes, NBA 1st round pick (10th overall) Washington Wizards
- Verron Haynes, NFL running back for the Pittsburgh Steelers
- Garrison Hearst, former NFL running back (Arizona Cardinals, San Francisco 49ers, Denver Broncos)
- Russell Henley, player on the PGA Tour
- Claude Hipps, NFL defensive back for the Pittsburgh Steelers
- Terry Hoage, former defensive back for six NFL teams over 13 seasons
- Reese Hoffa, shot putter ranked No. 1 in the world
- Dennis Hughes, NFL player
- Ryuji Imada, player on the PGA Tour
- John Isner, professional tennis player
- Andy Johnson, former football player for the New England Patriots
- Buckshot Jones, stock-car driver, two-time winner in the NASCAR Busch Series
- Daryll Jones, NFL defensive back for the Green Bay Packers and the Denver Broncos
- Jumaine Jones, professional basketball player
- Jeff Keppinger, MLB infielder for the Houston Astros
- Alec Kessler, NBA 1st round pick (12th overall), Miami Heat
- Chris Kirk, player on the PGA Tour
- Yoram Kochavy (born 1962), Israeli Olympic swimmer
- Kristy Kowal, 2000 Olympic silver medalist, swimming; NCAA Woman of the Year in 2000
- Billy Kratzert, professional golfer and sportscaster
- Franklin Langham, player on the PGA Tour
- Tommy Lyons, former NFL offensive lineman for the Denver Broncos
- Mike Macdonald, 2026 Super Bowl-winning Seattle Seahawks' head coach; youngest head coach in the NFL
- Mohamed Massaquoi, NFL wide receiver for the Cleveland Browns
- Randy McMichael, NFL tight end for the St. Louis Rams
- Bob McWhorter, football and baseball, Georgia's first All-America
- Adam Meadows, football player for the Denver Broncos and Indianapolis Colts
- LaVon Mercer (born 1959), American-Israeli basketball player
- Shannon Mitchell, NFL tight end for the San Diego Chargers
- Corey Moore, NFL safety
- Knowshon Moreno, NFL running back for the Denver Broncos
- Buster Mott, NFL defensive back for the Green Bay Packers
- Aaron Murray, football quarterback
- Derek Ogbeide (born 1997), Nigerian-Canadian basketball player for Hapoel Jerusalem in the Israeli Basketball Premier League
- Reid Patterson, 1956 Olympic Swimmer and former 50 freestyle world record holder, UGA Circle of Honor
- Mikael Pernfors, tennis pro, twice NCAA champion, runner-up in 1986 French Open Grand Slam Championship
- David Pollack, three-time football All-American, drafted in 2005 by the Cincinnati Bengals
- Jamie Pollock, professional soccer player
- Larry Rakestraw, Chicago Bears quarterback
- John Rauch, NFL creator of the West Coast offense, former coach of the Oakland Raiders
- Patrick Reed, PGA Tour golfer; winner of the 2018 Masters Tournament
- Nolen Richardson, New York Yankees, Detroit Tigers and Cincinnati Reds 3rd baseman; UGA Baseball Head Coach
- Saudia Roundtree, Naismith College Player of the Year in 1996
- Freddy Sale, MLB pitcher for the Pittsburgh Pirates
- Theron Sapp, NFL running back for the Philadelphia Eagles and Pittsburgh Steelers
- Allison Schmitt, 2008, 2012, 2016 Olympic swimmer, eight-time Olympic medalist
- Jake Scott, former NFL safety and Super Bowl MVP for the Miami Dolphins
- Sonny Seiler, former Georgia swimmer, owner of Georgia mascot Uga
- Richard Seymour, NFL defensive lineman for the New England Patriots
- D.J. Shockley, season record holder for most touchdowns responsible for and most touchdown passes in a season; NFL practice squad quarterback for the Atlanta Falcons
- Keren Siebner, Israeli Olympic swimmer
- Rory Singer (born 1976), mixed martial artist
- Frank Sinkwich, All-American football player and Heisman Trophy winner in 1942
- Vernon Smith, member of the College Football Hall of Fame and UGA Circle of Honor, UGA Baseball Head Coach
- Matthew Stafford, NFL quarterback for the Detroit Lions; drafted by the Detroit Lions first overall in the 2009 NFL draft
- Matt Stinchcomb, NFL offensive lineman Oakland Raiders, Tampa Bay Buccaneers, two-time football All-America, 1st round 1999 draft
- Jon Stinchcomb, NFL offensive lineman New Orleans Saints, football All-American, 2nd round draft choice
- Hudson Swafford, professional golfer
- Sheila Taormina, Olympic gold medalist, the only American to participate in the Olympics in three different sports
- Fran Tarkenton, nine-time Pro-Bowler as quarterback of the NFL Minnesota Vikings and New York Giants
- Corrinne Tarver, 1989 NCAA All-Around Gymnastics champion, coach of the Fisk Lady Gymdogs
- Christi Thomas, WNBA forward for the Los Angeles Sparks
- Odell Thurman, NFL linebacker for the Cincinnati Bengals
- Forrest Towns, Olympic Games gold medalist, world record holder, 1936, first Olympian and gold medalist from Georgia
- Charley Trippi, College and Pro Football Hall of Fame, two-time Pro Bowl halfback for the Chicago Cardinals
- Maicel Uibo, Estonian Olympic decathlete, silver medalist in 2019 IAAF World Championships in Doha, Qatar
- Shannon Vreeland, 2012 Summer Olympic gold medalist
- Hines Ward, NFL wide receiver and Super Bowl MVP for the Pittsburgh Steelers
- Danny Ware, running back for the New York Giants in the NFL, on team that won Super Bowl XLII
- Anna Watson, cheerleader and fitness model, credited as "The World's Strongest Cheerleader"
- Bubba Watson, player on the PGA Tour, winner of the 2012 Masters Tournament
- Don Wells, NFL defensive lineman for the Green Bay Packers
- Jodie Whire, NFL player
- Gene White, NFL defensive back for the Green Bay Packers
- Jermaine Wiggins, NFL tight end for the Minnesota Vikings
- Damien Wilkins, NBA guard for the Seattle SuperSonics
- Dominique Wilkins, NBA slam dunk champion for the Atlanta Hawks
- Dennis Williams (born 1965), basketball player

== Distinguished faculty and staff ==
The University of Georgia has boasted many distinguished researchers and scholars on its faculty. Notable past and present faculty and staff include:

=== Administration ===
- Donald R. Eastman III, served as the vice president for university relations at UGA 1991–1998; vice president for strategic planning and public affairs at UGA 1998–2001
- Karen Holbrook, former senior vice president for academic affairs and provost at UGA; former president of Ohio State University

=== Arts and humanities ===
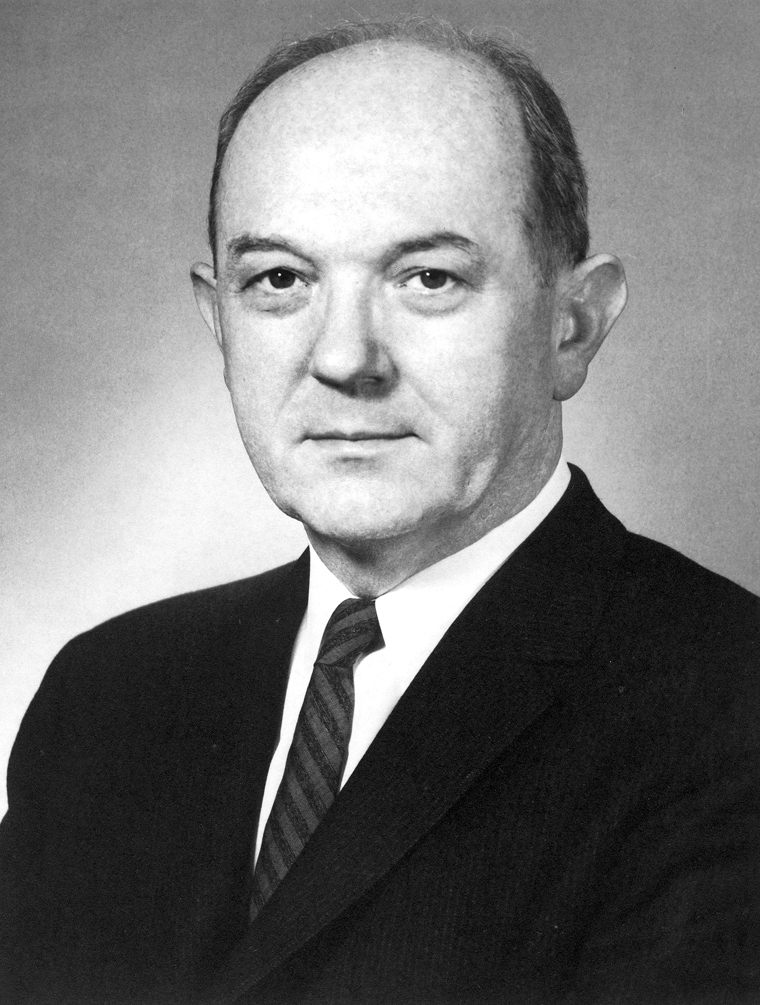
Dean Rusk, United States secretary of state and University of Georgia law professor

- Judith Ortiz Cofer, writer, Regents' and Franklin Professor of English and Creative Writing
- Chris Cuomo, professor of philosophy
- Lamar Dodd, U.S. painter and art professor
- Hugh Kenner, literary scholar and prolific critic, elected to American Academy of Arts and Sciences
- Edward J. Larson, professor of history, Pulitzer Prize winner for Summer for the Gods: The Scopes Trial and America's Continuing Debate Over Science and Religion
- William S. McFeely, professor of humanities, elected to American Academy of Arts and Sciences
- Cas Mudde, professor, political scientist, focuses on political extremism and populism in Europe and the United States, Prospect magazine's list of "World's Top 50 Thinkers"
- Gary Lee Noffke, artist and silversmith
- Romita Ray, art historian
- Dean Rusk, former U.S. secretary of state
- Freddy Wittop, Tony Award-winning costume designer

=== Education ===
- Donna Alvermann, educator, currently university-appointed Distinguished Research Professor of Language and Literacy Education at University of Georgia

=== Mathematics ===
- Andrew Granville, professor of mathematics and David C. Barrow Chair of Mathematics at UGA, 1991–2002
- Carl Pomerance, former professor of mathematics at University of Georgia, distinguished number theorist (Lenstra-Pomerance-Wagstaff conjecture)
- Robert Rumely, professor of mathematics at UGA and numbers theory researcher (Adleman–Pomerance–Rumely primality test)

=== Scientific research ===
- Norman Allinger, chemist, elected to National Academy of Sciences, awarded the Franklin Medal
- Allan Armitage, horticulturist, recipient of the National Educator Award from the American Horticultural Society
- John Avise, genetics researcher, elected to National Academy of Sciences, American Academy of Arts and Sciences, former member of faculty at University of Georgia, now a Distinguished Professor at University of California, Irvine
- Jeffrey Bennetzen, molecular geneticist, elected to National Academy of Sciences
- Brent Berlin, anthropologist, elected to National Academy of Sciences, American Academy of Arts and Sciences
- Murray S. Blum, entomologist, recipient of Lamar Dodd Award, authority on chemical ecology and pheromones
- Wilbur Howard Duncan, botanist, Fellow of American Association for the Advancement of Science
- William Flatt, animal and nutritional scientist, D.W. Brooks distinguished professor
- Stephen P. Hubbell, plant biology researcher, elected to American Academy of Arts and Sciences
- Eugene Odum, zoologist and groundbreaking pioneer in study of ecology, author of first textbook on the subject
- Henry F. "Fritz" Schaefer, chemist, elected to American Academy of Arts and Sciences
- Monica Turner, scientist known for her work since 1988 on the fire that devastated Yellowstone National Park, brought about by one of the worst droughts in U.S. history
- Susan R. Wessler, botanist and geneticist, elected to National Academy of Sciences
- Ying Xu, bioinformatician, elected to the American Association for the Advancement of Science

=== Sports ===
- Tevester Anderson, former associate head coach and chief recruiter for the Georgia Bulldogs 1986–1995, now head coach at Jackson State University
- Jack Bauerle, swimming and diving coach
- Wally Butts, football coach
- W.A. Cunningham, football head coach, basketball head coach
- Jim Donnan, football coach
- Vince Dooley, football coach (1964–88) and athletic director (1979–2004)
- Hugh Durham, head basketball coach 1979–1995
- Damon Evans, former athletic director and alumnus
- Mark Fox, 2009 men's basketball head coach
- La'Keshia Frett, former collegiate and professional basketball player and current assistant coach for the women's basketball team at UGA
- Ray Goff, football coach
- Jim Harrick, 1999–2003 men's basketball head coach
- Pete Herrmann, 2003–2009 men's basketball associate head coach, 2009 interim head coach
- Ron Jirsa, men's basketball coach, 1995–1997, associate head coach, 1997–1999 heach coach
- Ralph Jordan, 1946–1950 men's basketball head coach
- Andy Landers, women's basketball coach
- Dan Magill, tennis coach
- W.O. Payne, athletic director and alumnus
- Howell Peacock, 1912–1916 men's basketball head coach
- Mark Richt, football coach
- Mark Slonaker, 1975–1979 men's basketball player, returned as assistant men's basketball coach 1989–1995
- Kirby Smart, current head football coach and former Georgia safety (1996–99)
- Tubby Smith, 1995–1997 men's basketball head coach, assistant coach for the 2000 U.S. Olympic men's basketball team in Sydney, Australia
- Herman Stegeman, former basketball, football and athletics coach, including 17 years coaching track and field, in 1929 became athletics director; Stegeman Hall (now demolished) and Stegeman Coliseum were dedicated in his honor
- Steve Webber, former baseball coach; led Bulldogs to the 1990 College World Series championship, becoming the first SEC team to win the CWS
- Terri Williams-Flournoy, former assistant coach, women's basketball
- Suzanne Yoculan, women's gymnastics coach
