= Whittenburg =

Whittenburg is a surname. Notable people with the surname include:

- Dereck Whittenburg (born 1960), American basketball player and coach
- Donnell Whittenburg (born 1994), American artistic gymnast
- Jim Whittenburg (born 1946), American historian
- Roy Whittenburg (1913–1980), American businessman and newspaper publisher

== See also ==
- Whittenburg, Texas, a ghost town in Hutchinson County, Texas, United States
- Whittenburg Creek, a river of Crawford County, Missouri, United States
