= Eric Gleacher =

American businessman

Eric Gleacher (born April 27, 1940) is an American investor and financier, and the founder and former chairman of the now defunct, Gleacher & Company, an independent investment banking firm based in New York City.

== Early life and education ==
Gleacher attended Western Illinois University, where he competed in golf. He later transferred to Northwestern University and graduated with a B.A. in history in 1963, after which he served as an infantry officer in the U.S. Marine Corps for three years. Thereafter, Gleacher received his MBA from The University of Chicago Booth School of Business in 1967.

== Career ==
In 1978, Gleacher founded the mergers and acquisitions department of Lehman Brothers. He left Lehman, following its acquisition by Shearson, to head the mergers and acquisitions group at Morgan Stanley from 1985 through 1990. During this time, Gleacher was involved in the leveraged buyout of RJR Nabisco by Kohlberg Kravis Roberts & Co. as well as the leveraged buyout of Revlon by Ronald Perelman.

In 1990, Gleacher founded his own firm, Gleacher Partners, which he sold to National Westminster Bank in 1996 for $135 million. He bought back the firm in 1999 for less than $4 million and, in 2009, resold the firm for $65 million to the publicly traded Broadpoint Securities Group who renamed it Gleacher & Co. Gleacher was initially installed as CEO and chairman in 2010 but was ousted and replaced by Tom Hughes in 2011, retaining the position of chair until leaving in 2013.

On 13 March 2014, Gleacher & Co. announced that it would liquidate its remaining assets, having disbanded its investment banking business during 2013.

The University of Chicago Booth School of Business's downtown Chicago Gleacher Center is named in his honor.

Gleacher is on the board of trustees for the Hospital for Special Surgery and Northwestern University.
