= Two Maids & A Mop =

American cleaning franchise

Two Maids
- Type: Franchise
- Industry: Cleaning
- Founded: 2003; 23 years ago
- Founder: Ron Holt
- Headquarters: Birmingham, Alabama, United States
- Website: www.twomaidsfranchise.com

Two Maids is an American cleaning franchise based in Birmingham, Alabama. The company was ranked number 4 as a top job creator by Inc. in 2013. It is also an Inc. 5000 company, ranking both for "Top 100 Alabama Companies" and "Top 100 Consumer Products & Services Companies".

== History ==
Two Maids was established in 2003 by Ron Holt. Holt purchased a small cleaning business that he branded into Two Maids. The company grew into 12 company-owned locations, with its first franchise location being in Tampa, Florida. As of 2019, the company serves 91 markets across the United States.

== Partnership ==
The company is an active participant in Cleaning For A Reason, a national non-profit that partners with local cleaning businesses to provide cleaning services to cancer patients. In 2012, they were named Maid Service of the Year by Cleaning For A Reason for their work with the charity.

== Recognition ==
The company has been named a Stevie Award finalist in the Company of the Year – Diversified Services category for the 2015 American Business Awards. In 2016, Inc. Magazine named Two Maids the fastest-growing cleaning company in America. The residential cleaning service was ranked number 11 on Entrepreneur magazine's Top 100 New Franchises list in 2018 and was rated in the top two-thirds of the overall rankings on Entrepreneur's 2019 list.
