= Leonard DeLonga =

American painter

- Born: 1925
- Died: December 4, 1991 (aged 65–66)
- Occupation: Professor
- Writing career
- Subject: Art

Leonard DeLonga (1925 – December 4, 1991) was an American sculptor, painter, and professor at Mount Holyoke College. He was "best known as a metal sculptor, specializing in welded steel and bronze."

== Background ==
Delonga was originally from Canonsburg, Pennsylvania. He grew up working in steel mills around Pittsburgh and received his B.A. from the University of Miami in 1950. He then studied under Lamar Dodd at the University of Georgia, graduating in 1952. DeLonga taught at Georgia where he, "became a noteworthy metal sculptor." He also became known for his work in "alabaster, steel and bronze sculptures, oil paintings and drawings."

== Career ==
DeLonga joined Mount Holyoke in 1964 and established the sculpture program at the college (where he taught until his death in 1991). His studio was located in the basement of his home, which he shared with his wife Sandy DeLonga, close to the college.

He died of a brain tumor on Dec. 4, 1991. The Higgins Armory Museum held the "Leonard Anthony DeLonga: Modern Master of Medieval Metalwork" exhibit from October 1993 - July 1994. His work was represented by Kraushaar Galleries in New York City.
