= Oksana Lushchevska =

Ukrainian author

- Born: Oksana Lushchevska; 17 February 1982 (age 44); Talne, Soviet Union
- Occupation: Children's book writer
- Writing career
- Genre: Picturebooks
- Notable awards: White Raven Catalogue, 2017; shortlisted for the BBC Ukraine Children's Book of the Year; Best Children's Book Design, 2022.
- Website: lushchevska.com

Oksana Lushchevska (born 17 February 1982 in Talne, Soviet Union) is a Ukrainian children's books writer, translator, and poet. She is an active member of PEN Ukraine. Oksana is the author of over 50 children’s and young adult books. Her books were awarded several Ukrainian children’s literature awards. Some were included in the White Raven Catalogue and shortlisted for the BBC Ukraine Children’s Book Award. She won the Earth and Sky Poetry Contest funded by the Gloucester Culture Trust in 2020 and held in Charlotte, NC.

Oksana’s books are translated into 6 languages and published in 8 countries.

Oksana is the official Ukrainian translator of Eric Carle’s children’s books and Julia Donaldson’s funny poetry books for children.

She served as USBBY (United States Board on Books for Young People) children’s books reviewer, and a scholar, she contributed to School Library Journal, the Children’s Literature Assembly, Journal of Children’s Literature, The Bookbird, and the Seven impossible Things Before Breakfast Blog.

She is currently a children’s literature consultant and a creative curator on STORY+I Creative Workshop Group.

Oksana lives in State College, Pennsylvania.

== Education ==
Oksana has a PhD in Education and has taught children’s literature courses at the University of Georgia. She completed a master's degree in Comparative Literature and a Graduate Certificate in Children's Literature from the Pennsylvania State University. She received her B.A. in Ukrainian Language and Literature, English Language and Literature, and World Literature from Pavlo Tychyna Uman State Pedagogical University.

== Bibliography ==
Children's books

- Quiet Night, My Astronaut. Thomaston: Tilbury Publishers, 2023
- Blue Skies and Golden Fields: Celebrating Ukraine. North Mankato: Capstone Publishers, 2022
- About A Whale. Lviv: Old Lion Publishing House, 2014
- The Other Home. Lviv: Old Lion Publishing House, 2013
- The Caroling Wolf. Kyiv: Bratske, 2013
- The Best Friends. Lviv: Old Lion Publishing House, 2012
- Salty and Master Chef Tarapata. Kyiv, Grani-T, 2012
- Seva and Co. Ternopil, Navchalna Knyha – Bohdan, 2011
- Penpals. Lviv: Old Lion Publishing House, 2011
- Golden Wheel of a Year. Kyiv: Smoloskyp, 2011
- Escape. Kyiv: Grani-T, 2011
- Oksana Lushchevska about Christopher Columbus, John Newbery, Charles Darwin, Chaika Dniprova, Pearl S. Buck. Kyiv: Grani-T, 2011
- Christmas Stories. Kyiv: Grani-T, 2010
- Strange Chimerical Creatures, or Secrets of the Antique Chest. Kyiv: Grani-T, 2009

== Awards ==
- 2017 The Wind from Under the Sun was included in the prestigious White Ravens catalog of the world's 200 best children's books
- 2012 The Great Hedgehog Award Nominee
- 2011 Ukrainian Book of the Year Nominee
- 2009 Smoloskyp Literary Foundation Award
- 2008 Golden Stroke Ukrainian Children's Literature Contest Award
- 2007 Granoslov Award
