= Luke Tan =

American singer-songwriter

Luke Tan (born 1977), alias Michael Luchtan, is a country singer and songwriter. His songs are generally on the topics of life and death, the sadness of separation, and the despair of misfits. He criticizes society for hypocrisy and materialism. One of his songs was selected by Neil Young for a compilation of anti-war songs. In 2007, he released a serialized multi-media project over the internet in association with the street newspaper Street Roots called "Ghosts In The Flophouse". He is currently the director for the Asheville Tango Orchestra.

== Biography ==
Michael Luchtan was born in 1977 in Arkansas and grew up in Georgia. He studied computer science at the University of Georgia, in Athens. While there, he began playing with local and visiting artists such as Sacred Geometry. During his PhD studies, Luchtan moved to Lexington, Georgia. His first performance was for the local American Legion post, where he sang old country songs. He then began performing under the name Racecar at local venues. Some works have also been released under the name of My Alien Ways.

In the Summer of 2004, he left his job as a Programming Specialist in Bioinformatics for the Kissinger Research Group at the University of Georgia to dedicate his life to his music and ideals.

In 2006, he sold the farm in Lexington, Georgia and released a series of original content podcasts called "Stubbornly Curious" as he traveled across the United States in an RV.

His song "Revolution or Suicide", was made part of Neil Young's compilation "Living With War Today", a selection of war protest songs.

He created a weekly podcast in conjunction with the Portland Radio Authority called Altered Sound, which takes found sounds, alters, and arranges them in an experimental manner. It ran for eight episodes.

He has translated and interpreted the works of Mexican singer songwriter José Alfredo Jiménez

In 2010, he founded the Asheville Tango Orchestra.

== Discography ==
- 10 Sad Songs, 2004 (released under the Racecar moniker)
- Country Gold, 2004 (released under the Racecar moniker)
- Life is But a Wheel, 2005
- The Suicide King, 2005
- Untitled, 2005
- Forgotten Transmissions No. 1, 2006 Podcast release
- Return Of The Wandering Jew, 2006 Podcast release
- Stubbornly Curious no. 3, 2006 Podcast release
- Revolution Or Suicide, 2006 Podcast release
- Ghosts In The Flophouse, 2007 Podcast release
- Here Come The Floods, 2008
- Songs For A Mayday Picnic, 2009
- El Musico: Songs of José Alfredo Jiménez, 2010
