= Ron Holt =

American entrepreneur

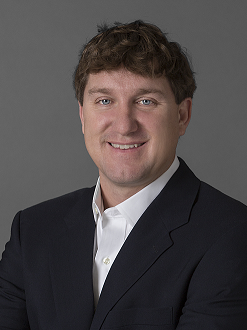
- Education: B.S.A.
- Alma mater: University of Georgia
- Known for: Founder of Two Maids & A Mop and Pink Zebra Moving
- Website: www.pinkzebramovingfranchise.com

Ron Holt is an American entrepreneur and founder of Two Maids & A Mop, a cleaning franchise based in Birmingham, Alabama and Pink Zebra Moving, a moving franchise brand based in Birmingham, Alabama. In 2013 he was named to the 40 Under 40 list of University of Georgia alumni.

== Early life and education ==
Holt is originally from a small town in southwestern Georgia, Colquitt. He graduated from Miller County High School in 1992 and later attended the University of Georgia College of Agricultural and Environmental Sciences where he obtained a biological sciences degree in 1997.

== Career ==
Holt began his career with the company Micromeritics where he worked as a chemical technician and later a laboratory director. He moved into the cleaning business after having a desire to become an entrepreneur.

Holt purchased a small cleaning business in 2003 which he later branded as Two Maids & A Mop. He grew the business into twelve company owned locations, and later opened the first franchise store in Tampa, Florida. Holt operates as the CEO of the company which ranked as a top job creator by Inc, and is also an Inc. 5000 company. The company currently serves 70 markets across the United States as of 2019.

== Awards and recognition ==
In addition to the awards he has received on behalf of Two Maids & A Mop, Holt was recognized by the University of Georgia Alumni Association in 2019 as the recipient of the Michael J. Bryan entrepreneurial spirit award. He was also named in 2013 as a member of the 40 Under 40 list of alumni. He was recognized again in 2014 by the Alumni Association as being the owner of one of the 100 fastest growing companies owned or operated by University of Georgia Alumni. Holt was ranked #9 on the list of 100. Holt's company has been named to the 2014 Birmingham Business Journal Fast Track 30 and 2015 Company of the Year by the American Business Awards. Holt has been featured in multiple national magazine articles; including Success, Entrepreneur and Better Homes & Garden.

CNBC Warren Buffett documentary
