= Jim Whittenburg =

American historian

- 2008
- Born: Rome, Georgia, US

Academic background
- Education: University of Tennessee (BA); Wake Forest University (MA); University of Georgia (Ph.D.)

Academic work
- Discipline: Historian

James Penn Whittenburg (born 1946 in Rome, Georgia, United States) is a professor of history at the College of William & Mary in Virginia.

Whittenburg was born in 1946 to Mr. and Mrs. James Edgar Whittenburg, Jr. in Rome, Georgia. He received his B.A. from the University of Tennessee, his M.A. (1971) in history from Wake Forest University (with a thesis entitled "The Black and White of Reconstruction in East Tennessee"), and his Ph.D. (1974) in history from the University of Georgia, where he wrote his thesis on the War of the Regulation. He taught at the University of Missouri before moving to the William & Mary in 1977. He served one term (2005–2008) as the chairman of the Lyon G. Tyler Department of History, following Dr. James McCord and succeeded by Dr. Philip Daileader.

Whittenburg was awarded the University Chair for Teaching Excellence from 1999 to 2002. Other awards include: the William and Mary Society of the Alumni Teaching Award, the Thomas Ashley Graves Jr. Award for Sustained Excellence in College Teaching, and the Freshman Advisor of the Year award. In 2007, several former students in association with the Virginia Historical society saluted Whittenburg as the "Greatest History Teacher". Whittenburg also taught actress Kim Basinger.

Whittenburg is married to Dr. Carolyn Sparks Whittenburg, the director of the National Institute of American History and Democracy (NIAHD); they were wed on December 27, 1970. Dr. Carolyn Whittenburg also received her M.A. from Wake Forest University in 1971, with a thesis entitled "James Dunwoody Brownson Debow: The Defender of New Orleans Prosperity". She received her Ed.S. (1997) and Ed.D. (2003) from the College of William & Mary. The collegiate NIAHD program has seen over 175 students since its creation in 2002. There is also a pre-collegiate NIAHD program which runs two summer sessions and enrolls rising high school juniors and seniors in one of the NIAHD courses at the college.

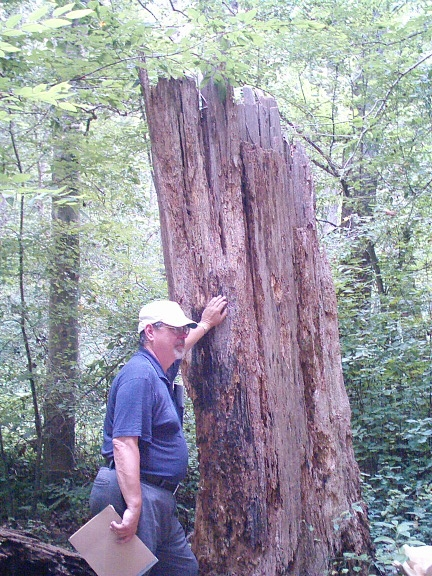
Whittenburg teaching a class at a Civil War battlefield

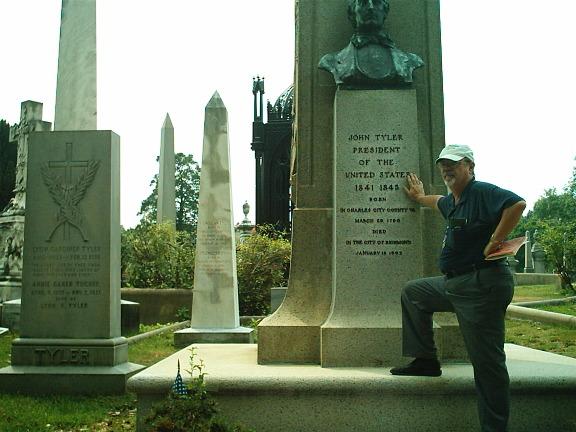
Whittenburg teaching a class at Hollywood Cemetery in Richmond, Virginia

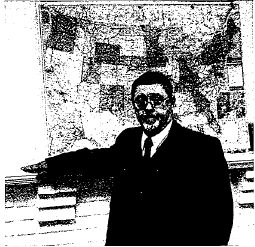
Whittenburg, Chairman of the Lyon G. Tyler Department of History at the College of William & Mary
