= University of Georgia =

Public university in Athens, Georgia, US

- The seal of the University of Georgia (1801).
- Latin: Universitas Georgiae
- Motto: Latin: Et docere et rerum exquirere causas
- Motto in English: "To teach, to serve, and to inquire into the nature of things." "To serve" was later added to the motto without changing the seal; the Latin motto directly translates as "To teach and to inquire into the nature of things."
- Type: Public flagship land-grant research university
- Established: January 27, 1785; 241 years ago
- Founders: Lyman Hall; Abraham Baldwin
- Parent institution: University System of Georgia
- Accreditation: SACS
- Academic affiliations: GRA; ORAU; Sea-grant; Space-grant
- Endowment: $2.18 billion (2025)
- President: Jere W. Morehead
- Provost: Ron R. Walcott
- Faculty: 3,954
- Students: 43,887
- Undergraduates: 32,824 (fall 2025)
- Postgraduates: 11,063 (fall 2025)
- Location: Athens, Georgia, US; 33°57′21″N 83°22′28″W
- Campus: 762 acres (3.08 km^{2}) (main campus) 41,539 acres (168.10 km^{2}) (total); Midsize city / College town
- Acceptance rate: 29.8%
- Newspaper: The Red & Black
- Colors: Red and black
- Nickname: Bulldogs
- Sporting affiliations: NCAA Division I FBS – SEC
- Mascot: Uga XI (live English Bulldog)
- Website: uga.edu

The University of Georgia (UGA or Georgia) is a public land-grant, sea-grant, and space-grant research university with its main campus in Athens, Georgia, United States. Chartered in 1785, it is the first state-chartered public university in the United States. It is the flagship university of the University System of Georgia.

In addition to the main campuses in Athens with their approximately 470 buildings, the university has two smaller campuses located in Tifton and Griffin. The university has two satellite campuses located in Atlanta and Lawrenceville, and residential and educational centers in Washington, D.C., at Trinity College of Oxford University, and in Cortona, Italy. The total acreage of the university in 30 Georgia counties is 41,539 acres (168.10 km^{2}).

The university is classified among "R1: Doctoral Universities – Very High research activity and doctorate production", and is considered to have "Very High" undergraduate admissions standards with "Higher Earnings". The University of Georgia's intercollegiate sports teams, commonly known by their Georgia Bulldogs moniker, compete in National Collegiate Athletic Association (NCAA) Division I as part of the Southeastern Conference (SEC). The university has had more alumni as Rhodes Scholars since 1990 than nearly all other public universities in the country. Alumni also include a United States poet laureate, Emmy Award winners, Grammy Award winners, and multiple Super Bowl champions.

== History ==
=== Antebellum history ===
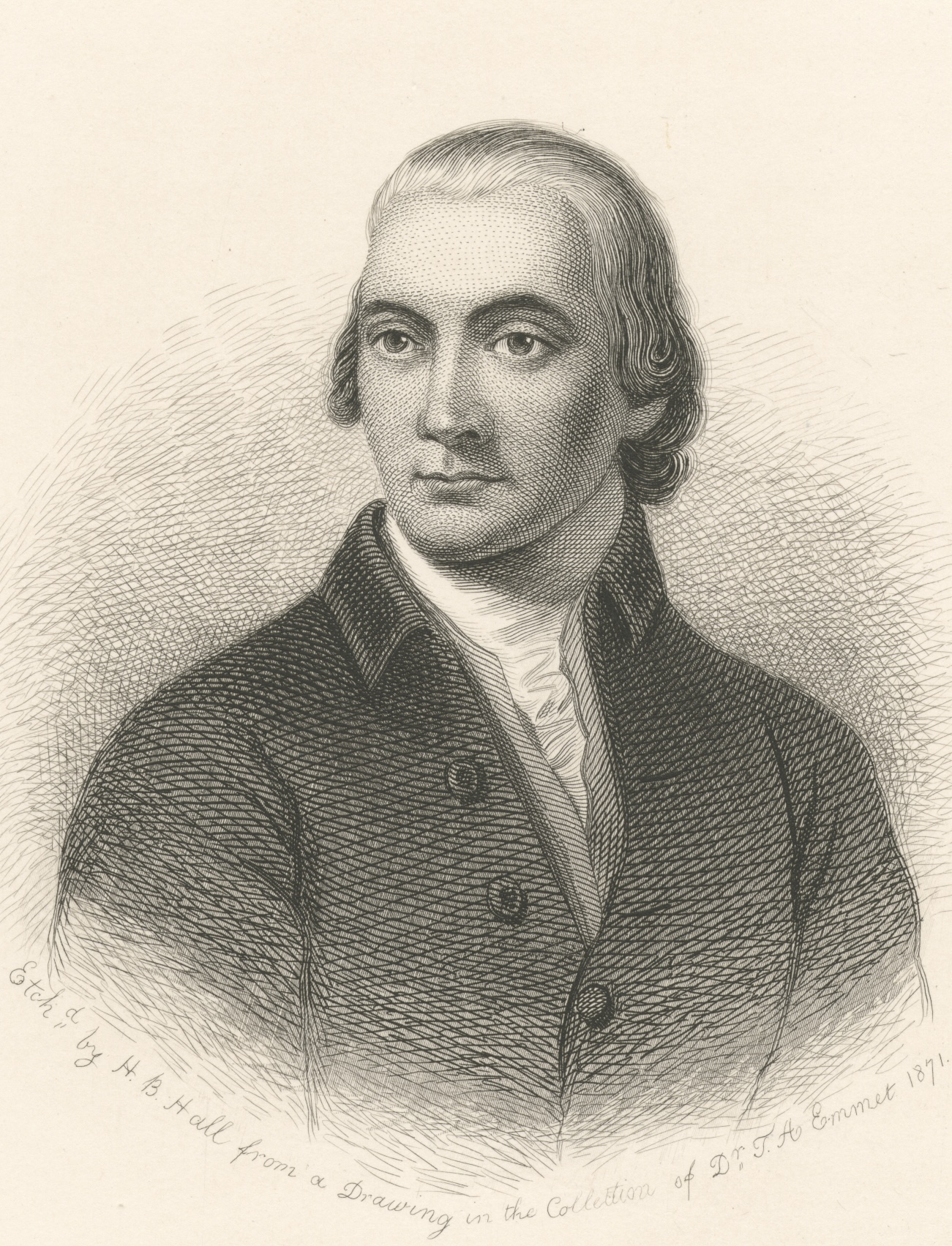
Lyman Hall, one of the founders of the University of Georgia

In 1784, Lyman Hall, a Yale University graduate and one of three medical doctors to sign the Declaration of Independence, as Governor of Georgia persuaded the Georgia legislature to grant 40,000 acres (160 km^{2}) as an endowment for the purposes of founding a "college or seminary of learning." Besides Hall, credit for founding the university goes to Abraham Baldwin who wrote the original charter for University of Georgia. Originally from Connecticut, Baldwin graduated from and later taught at Yale before moving to Georgia. The Georgia General Assembly approved Baldwin's charter on January 27, 1785, and the University of Georgia became the first university in the United States to gain a state charter. Considered one of the Founding Fathers of the United States, Baldwin would later represent Georgia in the 1786 Constitutional Convention that created the Constitution of the United States and go on to be President pro tempore of the United States Senate. The task of creating the university was given to the Senatus Academicus, which consisted of the Board of Visitors – made up of "the governor, all state senators, all superior court judges and a few other public officials" – and the Board of Trustees, "a body of 14 appointed members that soon became self-perpetuating." The first meeting of the university's board of trustees was held in Augusta, Georgia, on February 13, 1786. The meeting installed Baldwin as the university's first president.

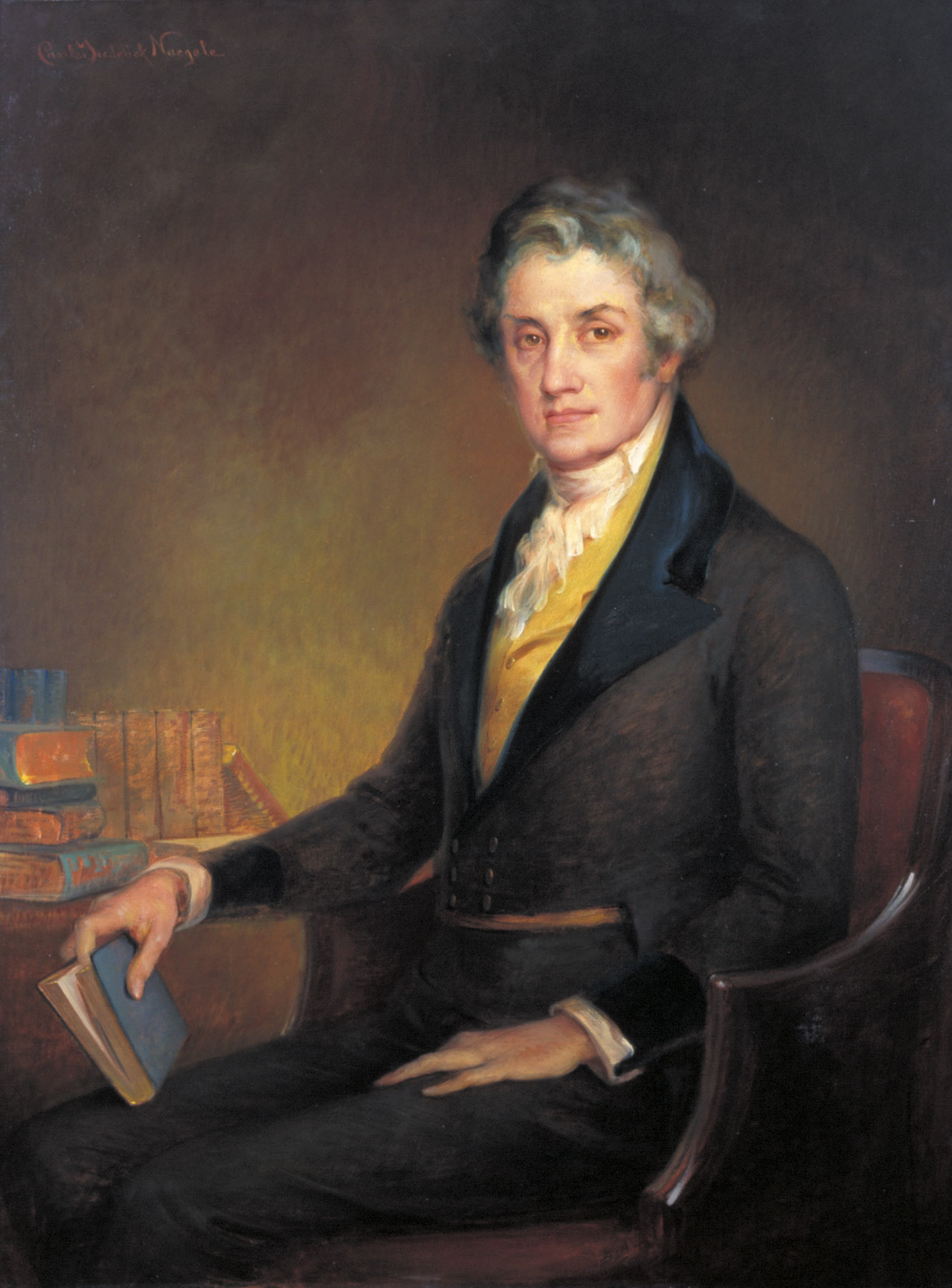
Abraham Baldwin, one of the founders and first president of the University of Georgia

For the first 16 years of the school's history, the University of Georgia only existed on paper. By the new century, a committee was appointed to find suitable land to establish a campus. Committee member John Milledge purchased 633 acres of land on the west bank of the Oconee River and immediately gave it to the university. This tract of land, now a part of the consolidated city–county of Athens-Clarke County, Georgia, was then part of Jackson County. As of 2013, 37 acres of that land remained as part of the North Campus.

Because Baldwin was elected to the U.S. Senate, the school needed a new president. Baldwin chose his former student and fellow professor at Yale, Josiah Meigs, as his replacement. Meigs became the school's president, as well as the first and only professor. After traveling the state to recruit a few students, Meigs opened the school with no building in the fall of 1801. The first school building patterned after Yale's Connecticut Hall was built the year later. Yale's early influence on the new university extended into the classical curriculum with emphasis on Latin and Greek. By 1803, the students formed a debate society, Demosthenian Literary Society. Meigs had his first graduating class of nine by 1804. In 1806, the school dedicated the first legacy building, Franklin College (named after Benjamin Franklin). The building is now known as Old College.

After the tenure of the next two presidents, John Brown (1811–1816) and Robert Finley (1817), a timeframe that saw enrollment drop, presidents Moses Waddel (1819–1829) and Alonzo Church (1829–1859) worked to re-engage new students. By 1859, enrollment had risen to 100 students, and the university employed eight faculty members and opened a new law school. During this timeframe, the university erected the New College building followed by the Chapel in 1832. Church was the longest-serving president in UGA history. In 1859, the state legislature abolished the Senatus Academicus, leaving the board of trustees as the only official governing body. When Church retired, Andrew A. Lipscomb was appointed to the newly renamed position of chancellor in 1860.

=== Civil War era and late 19th century ===
The University of Georgia closed in September 1863 due to the Civil War and reopened in January 1866 with an enrollment of about 80 students including veterans using an award of $300 granted by the General Assembly to former soldiers under an agreement that they would remain in Georgia as teachers after graduation. The university received additional funding through the 1862 Morrill Act, which was used to create land-grant colleges across the nation. In 1872, the $243,000 federal allotment to Georgia was invested to create a $16,000 annual income used to establish the Georgia State College of Agriculture and Mechanic Arts (A&M), initially separate and independent from the University of Georgia. However, A&M's funding was considered part of the university, which helped save it from bankruptcy during the Reconstruction era. As a land-grant school, UGA was required to provide military training, which the university began to offer in the 1870s.

Several of the university's extracurricular organizations began in the late 1800s. In 1886, fraternities at UGA began publishing the school's yearbook, the Pandora. The same year, the university gained its first intercollegiate sport when a baseball team was formed, followed by a football team formed in 1892. Both teams played in a small field west of campus now known as Herty Field. The Demosthenian and Phi Kappa literary societies together formed the student paper, The Red & Black, in 1883. In 1894, the University of Georgia joined six other southeastern schools to form the Southern Intercollegiate Athletic Association (SIAA).

=== Early 20th century ===
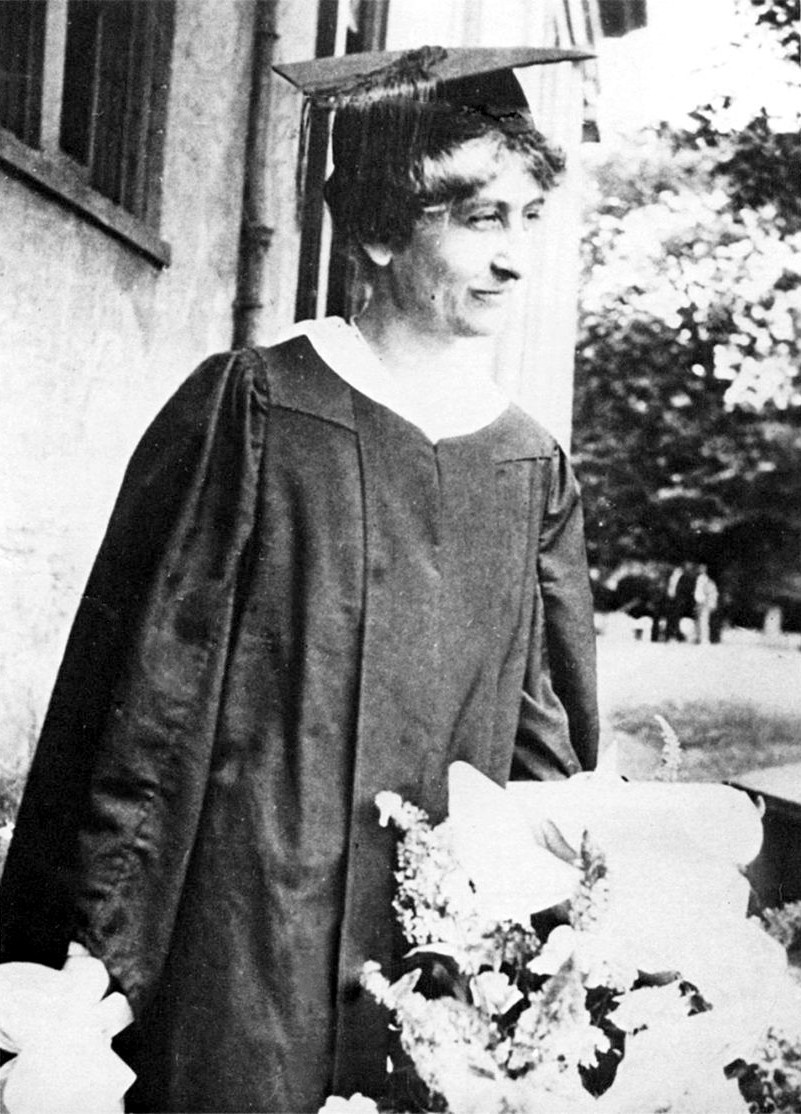
Mary Ethel Creswell, in 1919, the first woman to earn an undergraduate degree at the university

The turn of the century brought many changes in the administration and organization of the university including the naming of a new chancellor in 1899. Walter B. Hill became the first UGA alumnus to lead the university. A progressive leader, his six-year tenure, before his death from pneumonia, was marked with increased enrollment, expansion of the university's course offerings, and the addition of state funding through appropriation, for the first time bringing the university's annual income to over $100,000 in 1902. Hill and his successors David C. Barrow (1906–1925), Charles Snelling (1926–1932), and Steadman Sanford (1932–1935) would grow the school to take on the role of a true university. Many of the university's schools and colleges were established during Barrow's tenure. The College of Education (1908), the Graduate School (1910), the School of Commerce (1912), the School of Journalism (1915), and the Division of Home Economics (1918) were all established during this period. In 1906, UGA also incorporated the College of Agriculture by bringing together A&M (agricultural and mechanical) courses. The college of science and engineering continued as formed in the previous century. Conner Hall became the first building built in South Campus and first of several buildings that housed the university's agriculture programs on what came to be known as "Ag Hill". In 1914, the first Phi Beta Kappa chapter in the state of Georgia was founded at UGA. In 1923, another honor society, Phi Kappa Phi, established a chapter at the university. In 1920, UGA's athletic program was among 14 of the 30 universities to leave the SIAA to form the Southern Conference.

With students limited to white males for the first century of its history, the University of Georgia began admitting white female students during the summer of 1903 as postgraduate students to the State Normal School established in 1893 a few miles west of the campus. When the University of Georgia established a graduate school in 1910, female students were permitted to attend summer classes and some were also unofficially allowed to attend regular classes, as well. However, at that time only junior college transfers majoring in Home Economics were integrated into regular courses. Before official admission of women to the university, several women were able to complete graduate degrees through credit earned during the summer sessions. The first white woman to earn such a degree was Mary Dorothy Lyndon. She received a Master of Arts degree in 1914. Women were admitted as full-time undergraduates in 1918. Mary Ethel Creswell earned a Bachelor of Science in home economics in June 1919, becoming the first woman to earn an undergraduate degree at the university. Two UGA dormitories were later named after these graduates: Mary Lyndon Hall and Creswell Hall.

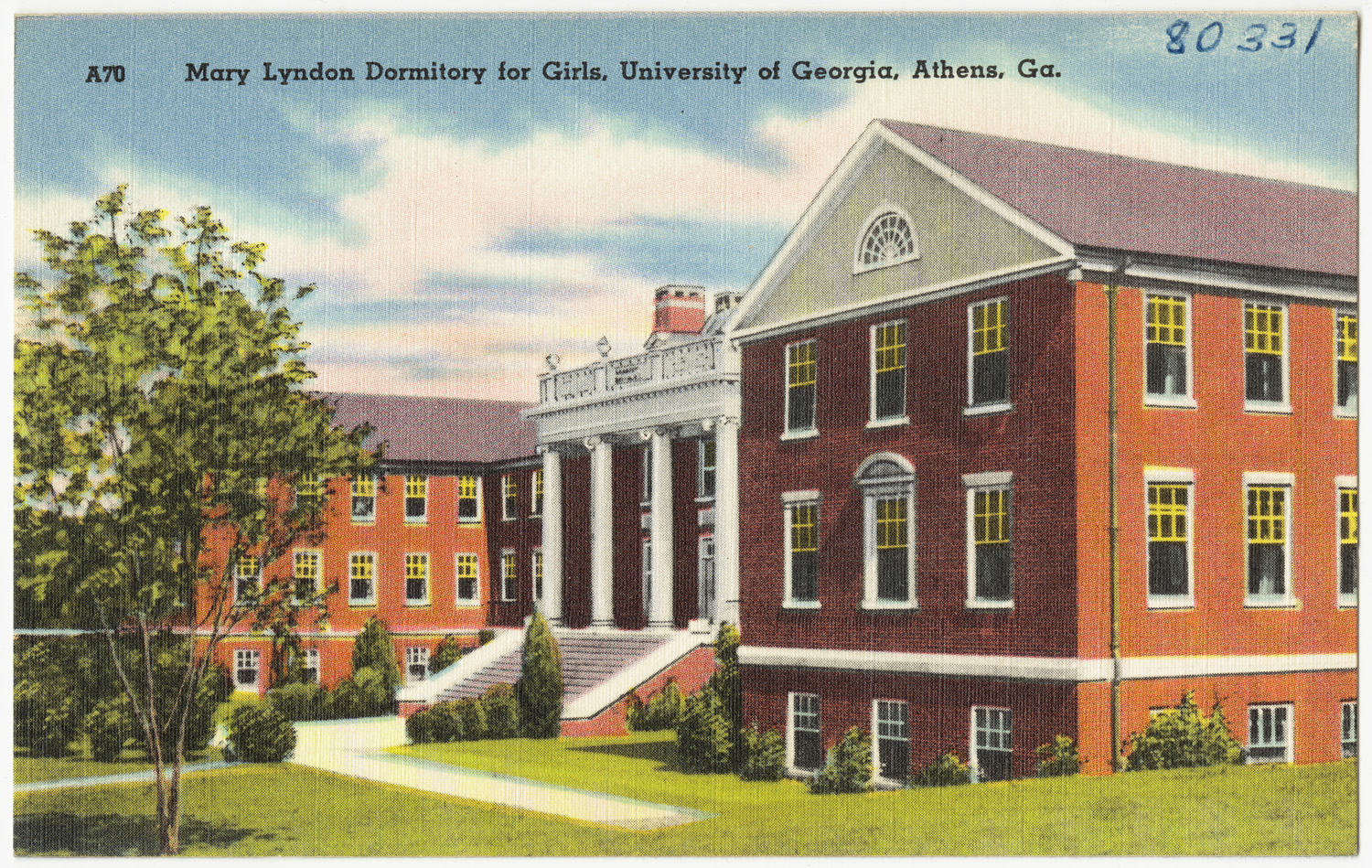
This postcard depicts Mary Lyndon Hall (built in 1938), named after the first female student at UGA to earn a graduate degree.

In 1932, the reorganization of the university's administrative structure continued through the establishment of the University System of Georgia (USG), which brought UGA along with several other public colleges in the state under the control of a single board of regents. The State Normal School (later State Teachers College) was fully absorbed by the College of Education, with the former's previous campus becoming UGA's Coordinate Campus. UGA and Georgia Tech traded several school programs; all engineering programs (except agriculture) were transferred to Georgia Tech and UGA received Georgia Tech's commerce program in return. The title of the university's lead administrator was changed from chancellor back to the original title of president. Sanford was named UGA's first president since 1860 and was succeeded by Harmon Caldwell (1935–1948). In 1933, the Division of Home Economics was reorganized as the School of Home of Economics, with UGA's first female graduate, Creswell, appointed as dean. The university also became a founding member of the Southeastern Conference and established the University of Georgia Press in 1938.

Throughout this period, UGA's enrollment grew every year with student population reaching 3,000 by 1937 and almost 4,000 by 1941. Through President Franklin D. Roosevelt's New Deal, UGA received a $2 million infusion of funding and an additional $1 million from the state legislature. The university used the new funds to make a number of improvements to the campus from 1936 to the early 1940s. Many renovation projects were undertaken including the establishment of five new residence halls, a dining hall, eight new academic buildings, a nursery school, and several auxiliary facilities. An engineering professor, Rudolph Driftmier, and architect Roy Hitchcock were responsible for the design of several buildings in the neoclassical style, giving the campus a homogeneous and distinctive appearance. The funds were also used to pave roads, build sidewalks, and improve the campus's landscaping.

=== Racial integration and the mid-20th century ===
The dean of the College of Education in 1941, Walter Cocking, was fired by Georgia Governor Eugene Talmadge in a controversial decision known as the Cocking affair. Talmadge was motivated by his belief that Cocking favored racial integration. The governor's interference in the workings of USG's board of regents prompted a response by the Southern Association of Colleges and Secondary Schools, which stripped UGA and nine other schools in the system of their accreditation. The issue became a major point of contention in Talmadge's 1942 re-election campaign. After his loss, a constitutional amendment passed by the state legislature gave the board independence from political interference which led to the schools quickly regaining their accreditation.

As the United States entered World War II, enrollment among male students dropped significantly, allowing female students to outnumber male students for the first time in the school's history. The United States Navy set up a Navy Pre-Flight School on the campus, occupying many of the university's buildings and constructing many new buildings and athletic facilities used by generations of students in the following decades.

In 1945, UGA accepted a donation of about 100 paintings from the New York art collector Alfred Holbrook and created the Georgia Museum of Art. In 1946, the School of Veterinary Medicine was re-established as a separate school, 13 years after it was discontinued as part of the agricultural college.

The following year, the quarterly literary journal The Georgia Review began publication in 1947. After Jonathan Rogers' brief tenure as president (1949–1950), Omer Clyde Aderhold started his 17-year-long stint as UGA president. During his tenure, the university sold Coordinate Campus to the U.S. Navy. He opened the school's main library, the Ilah Dunlap-Little Memorial Library, in 1952, and in 1964, established the School of Social Work. The university also built a new Science Center on South Campus consisting of six buildings. After UGA's pharmacy school moved to the new facility on the South Campus, the two portions of the campus took on distinct characteristics, with North Campus focused on arts, humanities, and law, and South Campus focused on natural sciences and agricultural programs.

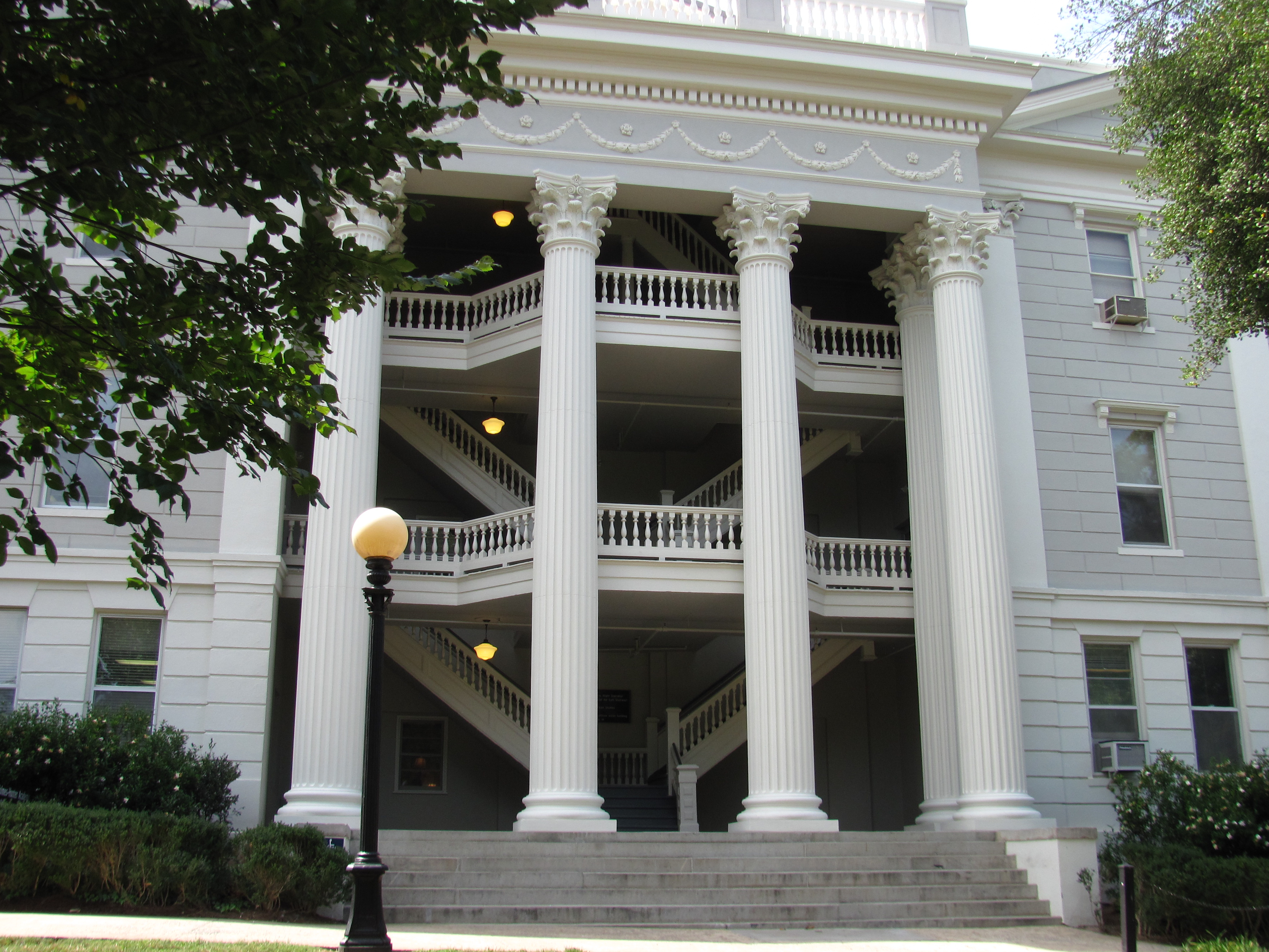
The Holmes-Hunter Academic Building

Until January 1961, Georgia state law required racial segregation in publicly funded higher education. On January 6, 1961, the District Court mandated that UGA immediately admit two African American teenagers, Hamilton E. Holmes and Charlayne Hunter, who were previously denied admission in 1959 on the basis of race. This court order was quickly followed by an injunction preventing the enforcement of the segregation-mandating state law. On January 11, a riot formed outside Charlayne Hunter's dormitory window, which "shouted racial insults, and tossed firecrackers, bottles and bricks at the dormitory window". Dean Williams suspended the two students for "their personal safety", but they returned to classes on January 16 following a court order. The university faculty subsequently formed a night patrol to help ensure the peace. Holmes graduated Phi Beta Kappa and was the first African-American student to attend the Emory University School of Medicine, where he earned his MD in 1967 and later became a professor of orthopedics and associate dean at Emory, the medical director at Grady Memorial Hospital, and a trustee of the University of Georgia Foundation, the university's private fund-raising organization. Hunter (later, Hunter-Gault) graduated with a degree in journalism and was awarded two Emmys and a Peabody for excellence in broadcast journalism. Commemorating the 40th anniversary of when Holmes and Hunter "walked through the Arch and into the Academic Building" to register for classes on January 9, 1961, the university renamed the campus building where they registered as the Holmes-Hunter Academic Building. The university now presents the Holmes-Hunter Lectures series, which brings noted African-American speakers to the campus each year to discuss racial issues.

In June 1961, Holmes and Hunter were joined by another African American, Mary Frances Early, who transferred to the school as a graduate student. Before Holmes and Hunter, Early became the first African American to graduate from UGA in 1962. The College of Education later established a professorship in her honor. In February 2020, the UGA College of Education was officially named in honor of Mary Frances Early.

=== Late 20th century ===
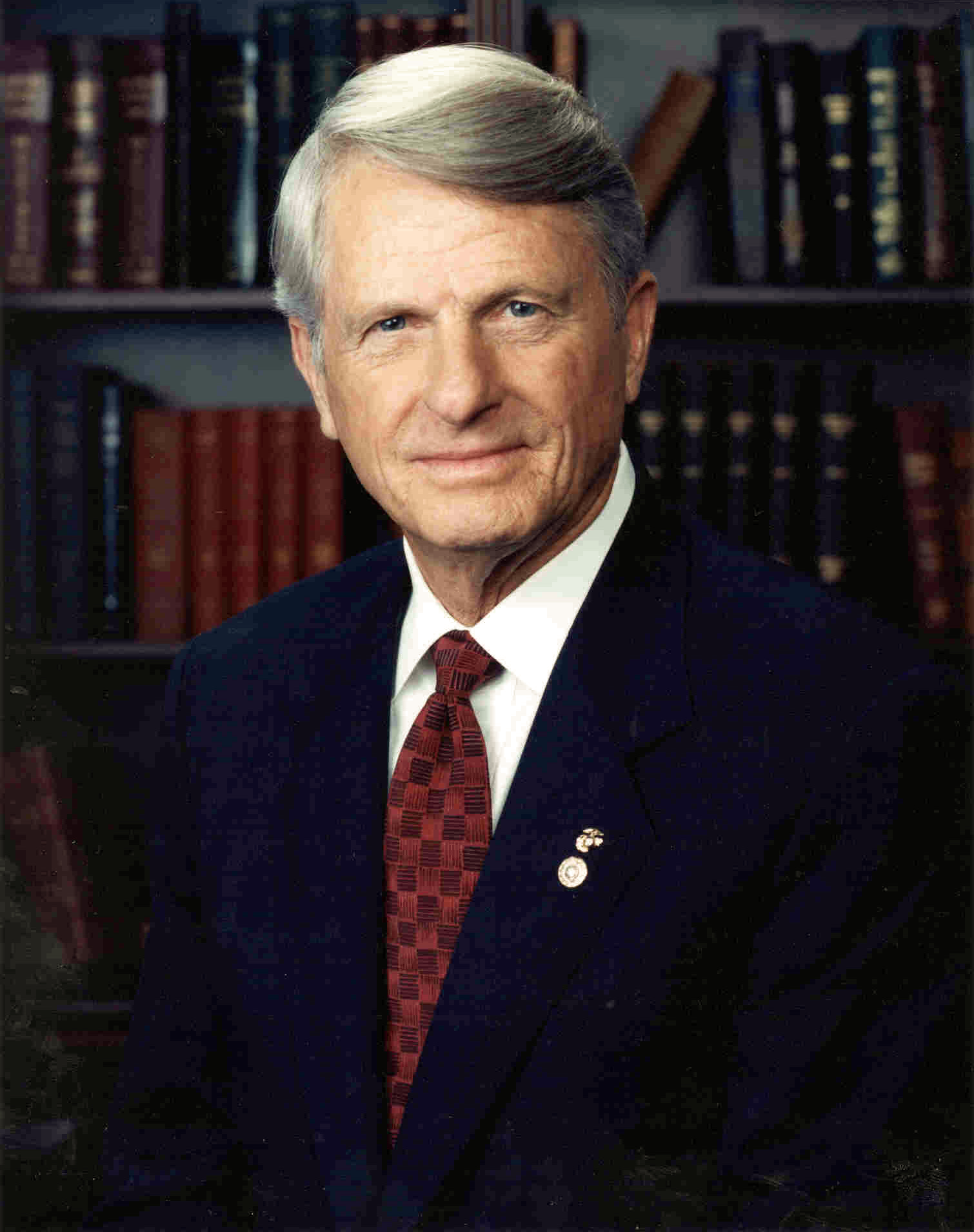
Zell Miller, UGA alumnus and former governor and U.S. senator who helped establish the HOPE Scholarship

In 1968, Fred Davison was appointed UGA president and served in the position for 19 years. During his tenure, the school's research budget increased from $15.6 million to more than $90 million. UGA inaugurated the School of Environmental Design, was designated as a Sea Grant College, and built 15 new buildings on campus. By the 1970s, the University of Georgia ranked among the top 50 research universities in the U.S. and in 1973, the Carnegie Commission on Higher Education designated UGA as a "Research 1 Doctoral University with very high research activity". By the time the school celebrated its bicentennial with a 15-month-long celebration, student enrollment had grown to about 25,000.

In the end, Davison's tenure as president was marred by controversy surrounding the dismissal of Jan Kemp, a faculty member who also tutored student athletes. Kemp filed a lawsuit against the university for her termination; it garnered national media attention and led to criticism of instances of lax academic standards for a few students participating in some of UGA's athletic programs. The courts finally awarded Kemp more than $1 million, leading to Davison's resignation in 1986 and student athlete academic standards revisions.

Henry King Stanford served as interim president before the appointment of Charles Knapp in 1987. Together with UGA alumnus and Georgia Governor Zell Miller, Knapp helped establish the state's HOPE Scholarship in 1993 with funds appropriated from the new state lottery. Knapp also was a founding member of the Georgia Research Alliance, and construction projects totaling more than $400 million were started during his administration, including the Biological Sciences Complex (1992), Ramsey Student Center for Physical Activities (1995), the Performing Arts Center, Hodgson Hall (1996), the music building (1996), the Georgia Museum of Art (1996), Dean Rusk Hall (1996), and the UGA Welcome Center (1996). The campus hosted four events in the 1996 Summer Olympics: rhythmic gymnastics, volleyball, women's Gold Medal football match, and men's Gold Medal football match. In 1997, Knapp was succeeded by Michael Adams, who served as UGA president for 16 years, well into the 21st century. After his retirement as president, Knapp continued to serve by joining UGA's Institute of Higher Education as a part-time Distinguished Public Service Fellow and as a professor of economics in the university's Terry College of Business.

=== 21st century ===
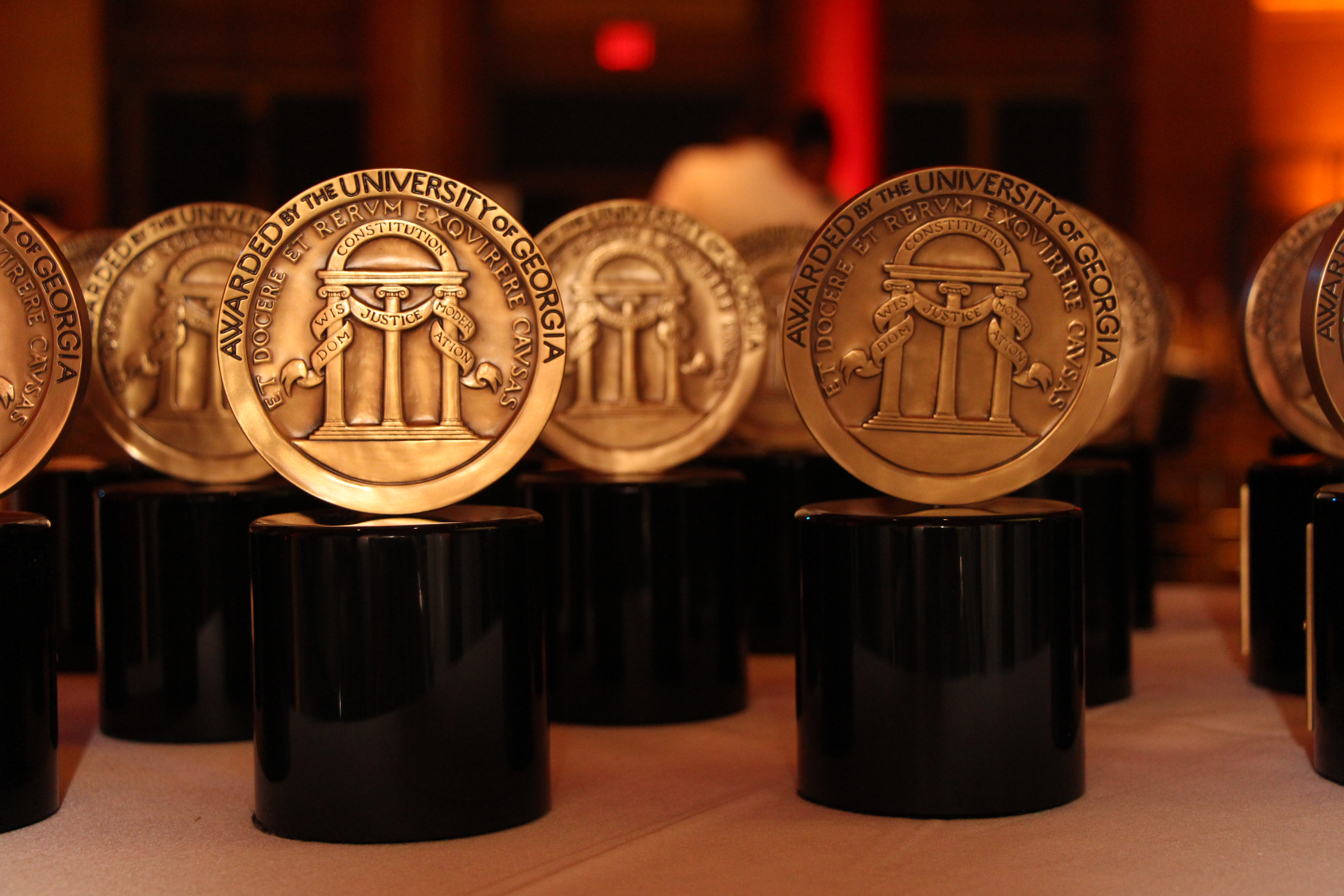
The Peabody Awards (statuettes pictured) originated at, and are awarded by, the University of Georgia

Adams began a strategic plan to grow the university's academic programs in the new century. In 2001, UGA inaugurated the College of Environment and Design and the School of Public and International Affairs, the first new schools to open since 1964. The strategic plan also chose medicine and health sciences as a major focus of growth and development. Together with Provost Karen Holbrook and Arnett Mace (who succeed Holbrook), Adams opened the Biomedical and Health Sciences Institute, the UGA Cancer Center, the Center for Tropical and Emerging Global Diseases, and the Regenerative Bioscience Center. In 2005, the College of Public Health was created to bring together the various medical and health sciences programs. In 2011, UGA purchased back the former campus of the State Normal School from the U.S. Navy to create the UGA Health Sciences Campus. The Health Sciences Campus provides additional medical and health sciences programs including the School of Medicine. The newly reacquired campus also became home to the College of Public Health. The Odum School of Ecology (2007) and the College of Engineering (2012) became the fourth and fifth schools to open during Adams's tenure.

After Adams's retirement on June 30, 2013, Jere Morehead was appointed as UGA's 22nd president. Morehead is an alumnus of UGA's law school and previously served as provost and vice president of academic affairs. Under Morehead, UGA has continued its focus on teaching and research with the 2018 report by The Center for Measuring University Performance ranking the University of Georgia 37th among the top research universities in the nation, and overall research and development funding increasing by 75% since fiscal year 2015 resulting in $654 million in R&D expenditures in fiscal year 2025. In 2015, the College of Veterinary Medicine moved its teaching hospital to a new off-campus facility, leaving its previous building available for research and other uses. In September 2017, UGA used a combination of private and public funds to complete the Terry College of Business complex of six buildings. Also during Morehead's presidency, the university added the Morehead Honors College, School of Computing, and School of Medicine. In 2020 the university concluded its fundraising campaign, after raising $1.45 billion.

== Organization and administration ==
College/school	Founded
Franklin College of Arts and Sciences	1801
School of Law	1859
College of Agricultural and Environmental Sciences	1859
College of Pharmacy	1903
Warnell School of Forestry and Natural Resources	1906
Mary Frances Early College of Education	1908
Graduate School	1910
Terry College of Business	1912
Grady College of Journalism and Mass Communication	1915
College of Family and Consumer Sciences	1918
College of Veterinary Medicine	1946
School of Social Work	1964
College of Environment & Design	2001
School of Public and International Affairs	2001
College of Public Health	2005
Odum School of Ecology	2007
College of Engineering	2012
Morehead Honors College	2021
School of Computing	2022
School of Medicine	2024
Victoria Kay Ivester School of Nursing	2025

The university has 21 schools and colleges, where the titles "college" or "school" do not indicate any distinction between them for the university. The university added a medical school that has its first class in the fall of 2026 and provides education leading to the Doctor of Medicine (M.D.) degree from the University of Georgia as well as extensive facilities for medically related education and research at the University of Georgia. In the construction phase is a $100 million facility set to open in 2026 to provide training for at least 60 more University of Georgia medical students. In 2025, a school of nursing was authorized for classes to begin in 2027.

The President of the University of Georgia (Jere Morehead) is the head administrator and is appointed and overseen by the Georgia Board of Regents. University of Georgia has had 22 presidents since its founding in 1785. Each individual college and school is headed by a dean. The university has a student-to-faculty ratio of 17 students per faculty member.

According to the 2026–2027 estimated cost of attendance, based on a nine-month academic year for an average undergraduate student, the tuition and fees for Georgia residents is $10,881, and $32,551 for non-residents. The tuition and fees for an average international undergraduate student (based on a nine-month academic year) is $33,475.

== Campuses ==
- Old North Campus, University of Georgia
- U.S. National Register of Historic Places
- U.S. Historic district
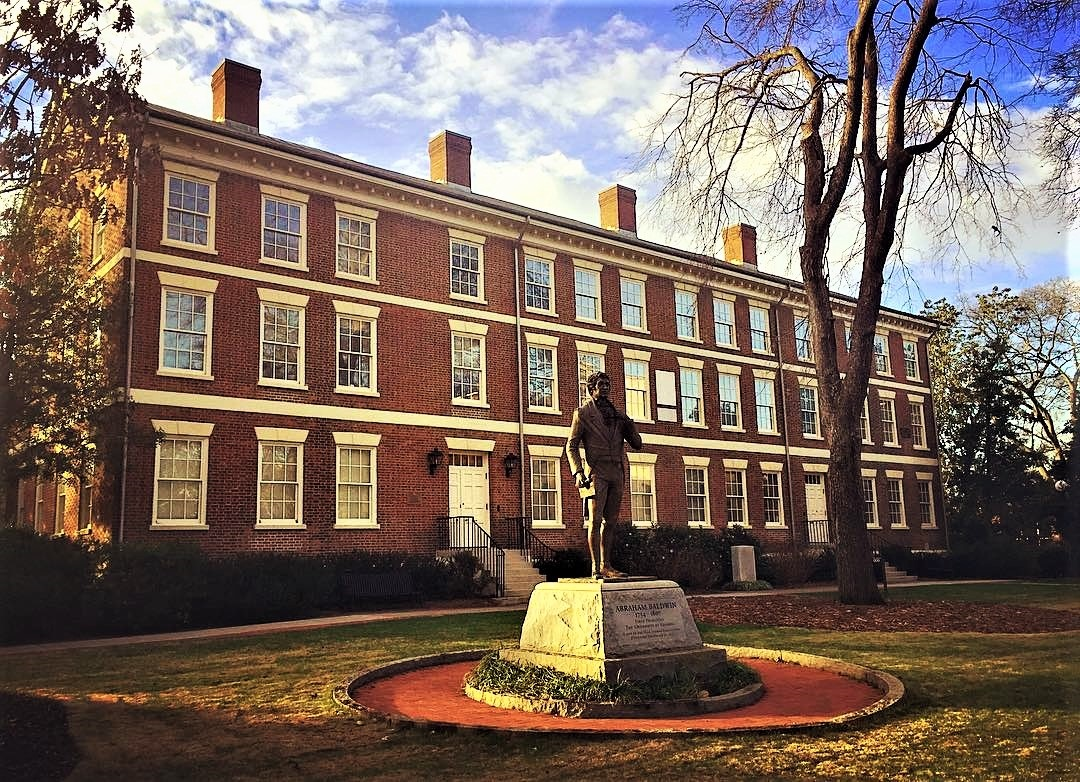
- Old College Building
- Location: Bounded by Broad, Lumpkin, and Jackson Streets
- Coordinates: 33°57′20.839″N 83°22′28.119″W
- Area: 37 acres (15 ha)
- Built: 1801–1858
- Architectural style: Greek Revival; Second Empire; Federal
- NRHP reference No.: 72000379
- Added to NRHP: March 16, 1972

The University of Georgia's main campus is made up of 465 buildings covering an area of about 762 acres (308 hectares). The campus was ranked among the nation’s most beautiful by Travel + Leisure. The university owns an additional 39,743 acres (160.83 km^{2}) of land in 31 counties across Georgia, and has off-campus facilities including in Washington D.C., at Trinity College of Oxford University, at Cortona, Italy, and at Monteverde, Costa Rica. Near the main campus is a Botanical Garden and the university's 56-acre UGA Health Sciences Campus. As of October 2020, UGA employed 11,127 people of which more than 2,500 are faculty members. The main campus sits across from Athens, a consolidated city–county located 60 miles northeast of downtown Atlanta.

The campuses' dominant architectural themes are Federal, Classical and Antebellum style. Though there have been many additions, changes, and augmentations, the University of Georgia's campus maintains its historic character. In 2000, the entire campus was designated as an arboretum, the University of Georgia Campus Arboretum. It is estimated to be home to about 9,000 trees with over 154 identified species including native trees such magnolias, red oaks, white oaks, and beeches, as well as non-native trees such as the North Africa Atlas cedar, the Chinese parasol and royal paulownia, and the Japanese zelkova and black pine.

=== North Campus ===
The North Campus is bounded by Baldwin Street to the south, Lumpkin Street to the west, Broad Street to the north and traditionally by Jackson Street to the east, but also extends past Jackson Street to East Campus Road. Several of the buildings that make up the old campus are designated as historic, covering part of the 37 acres (15 hectares) originally gifted to the university in 1801. The entire Old North Campus of the University of Georgia is listed in the National Register of Historic Places as a historic district.

Located at a central location in North Campus and constructed in 1806 as the first permanent building, Old College is the oldest building in Athens and one of the oldest in Northeast Georgia. The building closely resembles Yale University's Connecticut Hall. It was designed with identical front and back to allow the university to grow in either direction. Currently housing the Franklin College of Arts and Sciences, the building originally served both instructional and residential purposes. New College was built in 1823 as a residence hall and was rebuilt in 1832.

Other historic buildings in the National Historic District include Waddel Hall, Demosthenian Hall, The chapel, Phi Kappa Hall, Lustrat Hall, Moore College, and Holmes–Hunter Academic Building. Named after UGA's fifth president, Waddel Hall is the second-oldest building on campus. Built in the Federal style of architecture in 1821, it is also one of the smallest buildings on campus. Home to the oldest student organization and debate society at UGA, the 1824 Demosthenian Hall houses the Demosthenian Literary Society named after the Greek orator Demosthenes. Founded in 1803, the Demosthenian is among the oldest literary societies in the English-speaking world. Located between New College and Demosthenian Hall, The chapel is a Greek Revival-style building which resembles a classic temple. Considered "the most beautiful building on campus", the interior features a large painting of the nave and aisles of the St. Peter's Basilica, painted by the artist George Cooke. Also built in the Greek Revival style in 1836, Phi Kappa Hall is home to the university's second-oldest student organization and debate society, Phi Kappa Literary Society, founded in 1820 to rival the Demosthenian Literary Society.

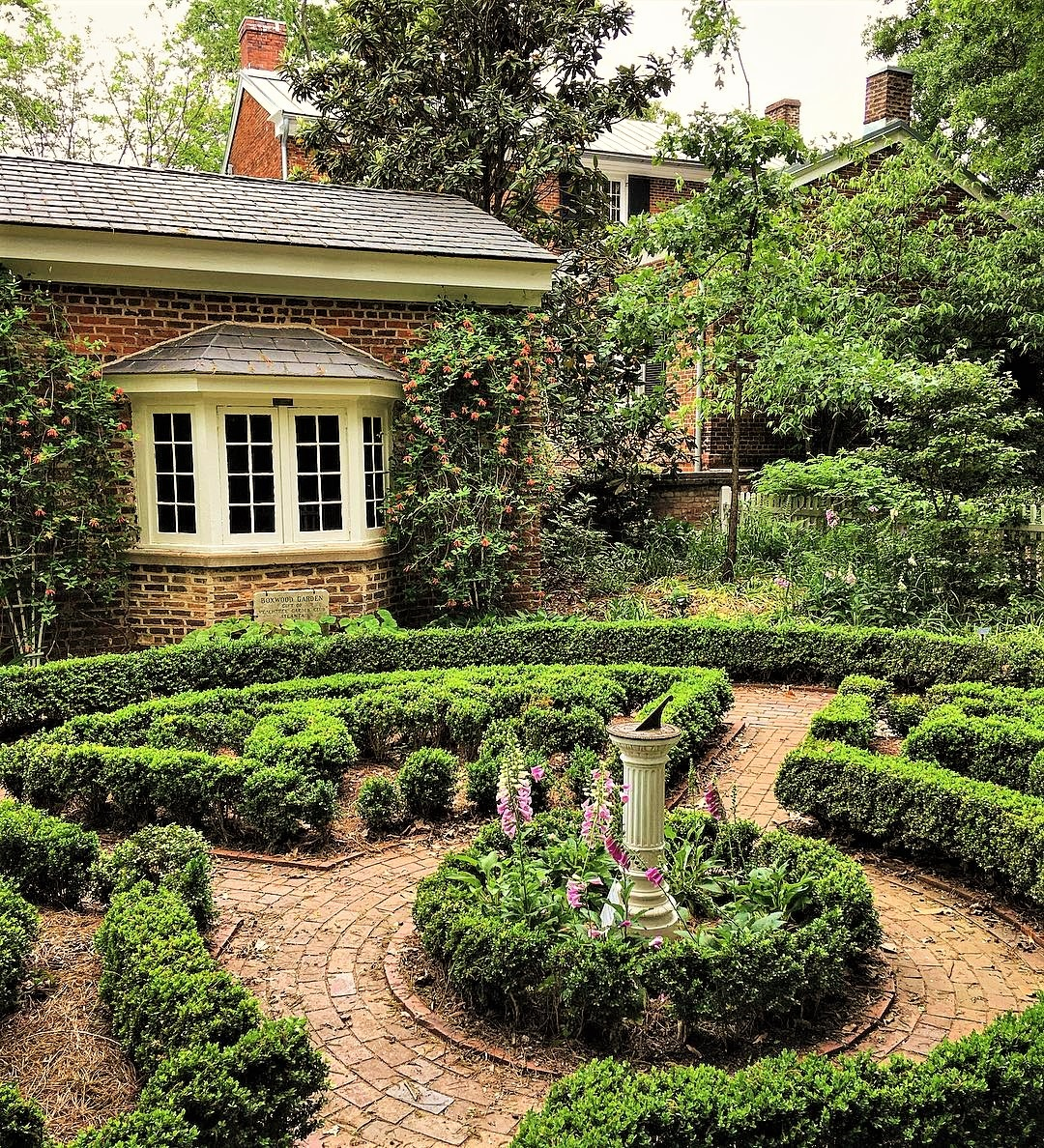
Founders Memorial Garden

The seventh-oldest building on campus, Lustrat Hall was originally built in 1847, north of its current location. Named after its last faculty occupant, it is the only remaining faculty residence house from Old North Campus. Used for a variety of purposes in the past, the building most recently houses the Office of Legal Affairs. Built in 1874, Moore College is the only remaining building constructed during post-Civil War Reconstruction. Originally home to the College of Agriculture and Mechanic Arts, Moore College currently houses the university's Honors Program. The Holmes/Hunter Academic Building was simply known as the Academic Building when it was originally assembled in 1905. Following a Beaux-Arts architectural design by engineering professor Charles Strahan, the building was constructed by inserting a new building in between the older Ivy Building and Old Library. In 2001, the building was renamed after the first two African-American students at UGA. It houses the Office of the Registrar, and several other administrative offices. Also listed in the National Register of Historic Places is the Founders Memorial Garden which is named in honor of the Ladies Garden Club of Athens. Founded in 1891, it was the first garden club in the United States.

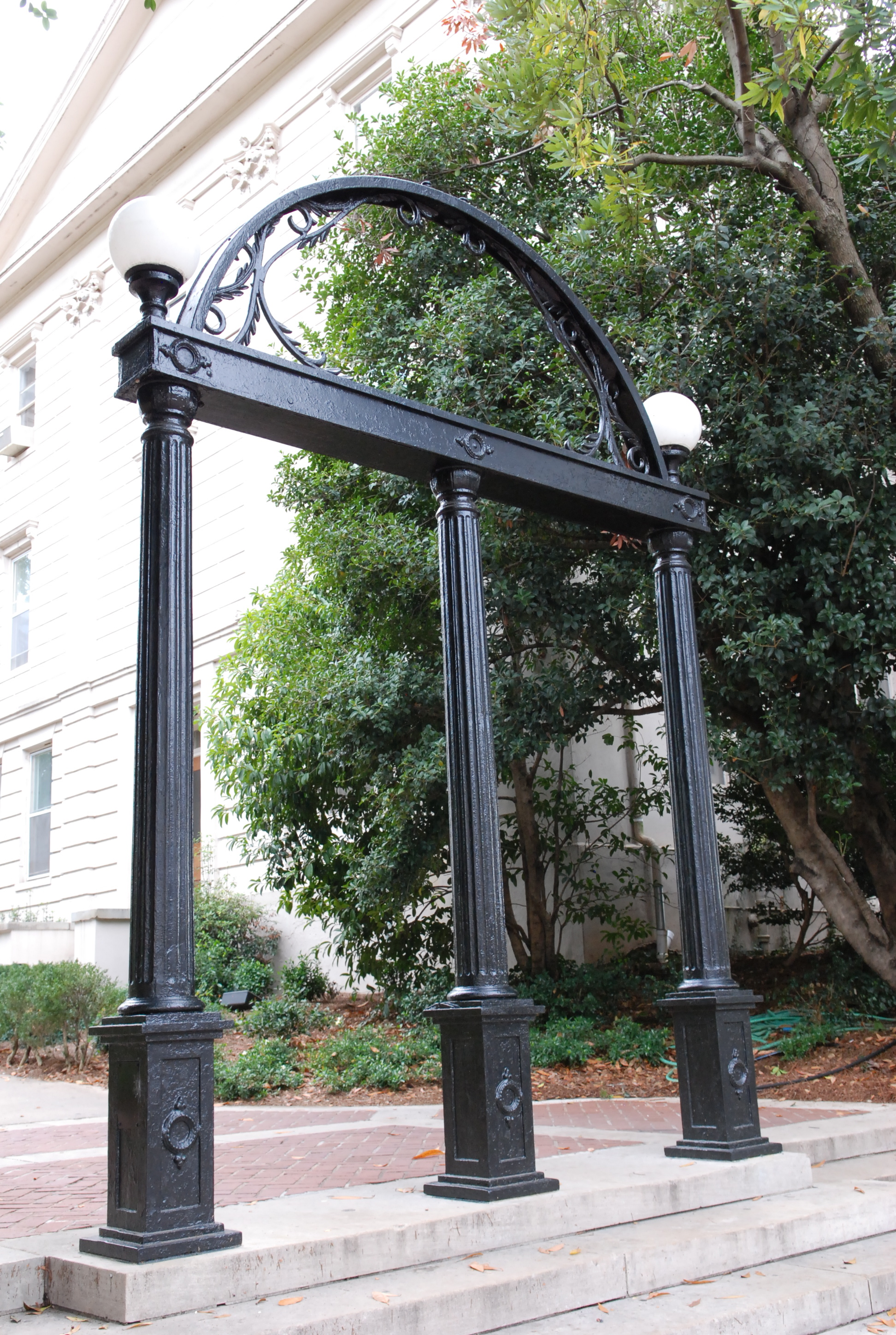
The Arch

Throughout the historic buildings, several architectural, sculptural, and landscape features adorn the North Campus. Chief among them is The Arch which serves as the traditional entrance to the campus. Built in 1858 and modeled after the Great Seal of the State of Georgia, the area near the three-columned gate is a popular venue for the staging of demonstrations, gatherings, protests, and rallies. Although the Seal's three pillars represent the state's three branches of government, the pillars of The Arch are usually taken to represent the Georgia Constitution's three principles of wisdom, justice, and moderation, which are engraved over the pillars of the Seal. On the opposite side of the Arch Quad, at the front of the Old College building sits a statue of the university's founder Abraham Baldwin, installed by the University of Georgia Alumni Association. The President's Club Garden, first planted in 1973 on the opposite side of the Old College building, honors the thousands of families who have made major financial contributions to the university. A fountain named after Hubert B. Owens and built in 1989 is tucked in the space between Old College, Lustrat House, and the Administration Building. Serving as a UGA faculty member for 45 years, Owen was responsible for initiating the university's landscape architecture program, which later grew into the College of Environment and Design.

The Administration Building is another one of the later additions to the North Campus built in 1905 with $50,000 donated to the university from a major contributor, the philanthropist George Foster Peabody. It was the first building on campus designed to be fireproof in light of the fact that several fires in UGA's history have destroyed key buildings. Originally used as the location for a library, it houses the offices of the university president and other senior administrative offices. Hirsch Hall was built in 1932 in Georgian style and named after Harold Hirsch who for a long period served as general counsel to The Coca-Cola Company. The building is home to the School of Law and the Alexander Campbell King Law Library located in a north-side addition built in 1967. Hirsch Hall connects by way of an overhead bridge to the J. Alton Hosch Law Library Annex built in 1981 and named after the former dean of the law school.

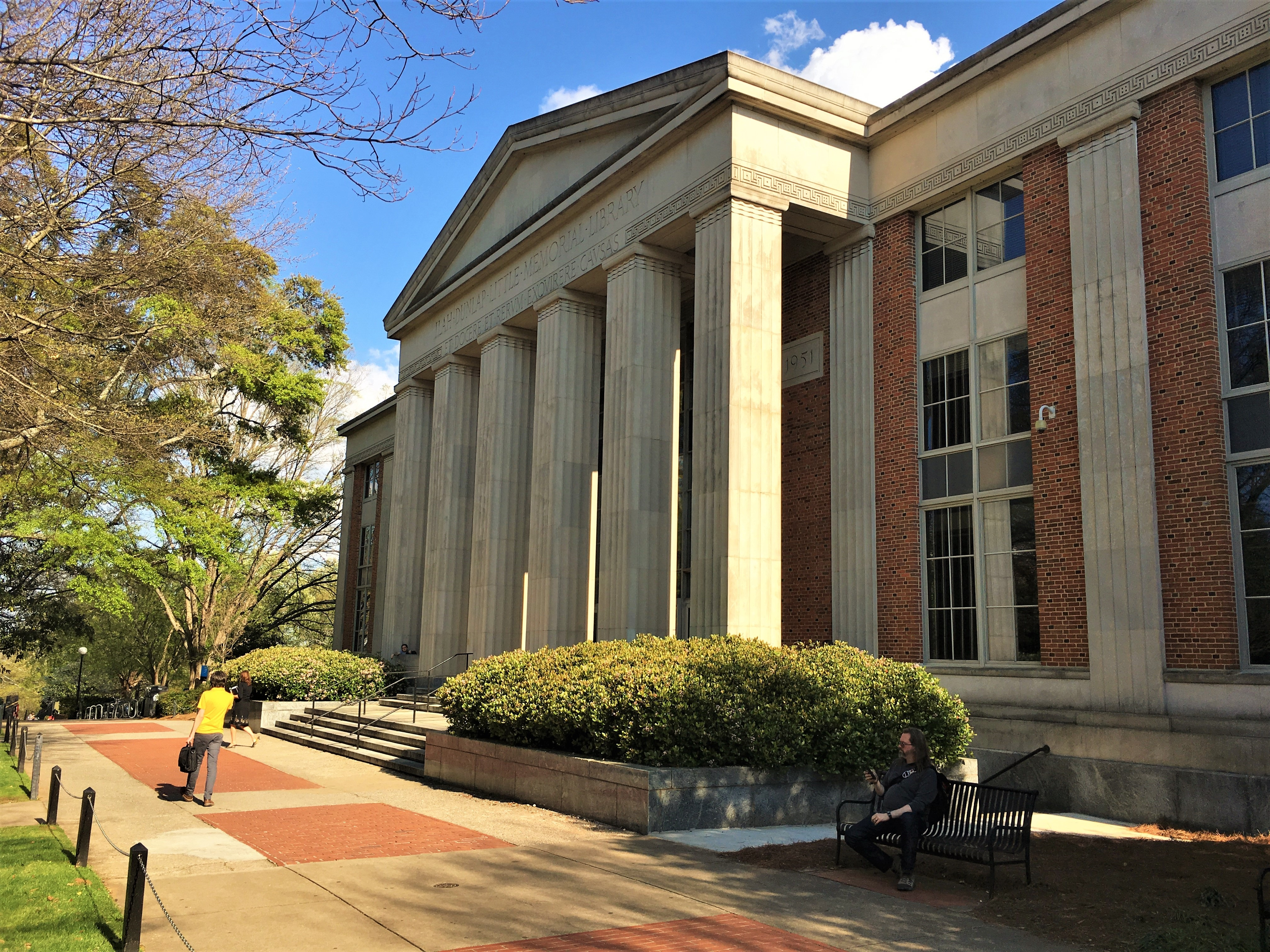
Ilah Dunlap Little Memorial Library

The university's main library, the Ilah Dunlap Little Memorial Library, was built with funds bequeathed by its namesake, the wife of a UGA alumnus who stipulated several design requirements including that it face north across the mall towards Old College. Home to the University of Georgia Press and the Georgia Review, the library serves as the headquarters to a network of secondary libraries located throughout the campus. Following the addition of a seven-story annex in 1974, the library became the third-largest academic building at UGA and the largest in North Campus. The main library is part of a quad consisting of Hirsch Hall, Old College, Waddell Hall and Peabody Hall. Although the aforementioned George Foster Peabody also contributed to funds used to build Peabody Hall, the building is actually named after George Peabody who in an 1869 testamentary trust created a $2.25-million fund to benefit several universities in the South. The University of Georgia combined $40,000 from this fund with other contributions to construct Peabody Hall which houses the Departments of Religion and Philosophy and the Institute of Native American Studies.

=== South Campus ===
Located across Field Street from Central Campus to its north, South Campus is encircled by East Campus Road to its east, Pinecrest Drive to the south, and Lumpkin Street to the west. It is connected to the areas to its north by way of the Jim Gillis Bridge, named after the former director of the Georgia State Highway Board. South Campus is the largest of the five segments of the UGA campus, latitudinally stretching for more than a mile. Originally begun as an expansion to accommodate the growing agricultural programs in an area known as "Ag Hill", it is home most of the university's science and engineer programs. In 2006, work was completed on D. W. Brooks Mall to give the campus a more green aesthetic similar to North Campus, replacing parking lots and a section of the street by the same name which bisected the area lengthwise.

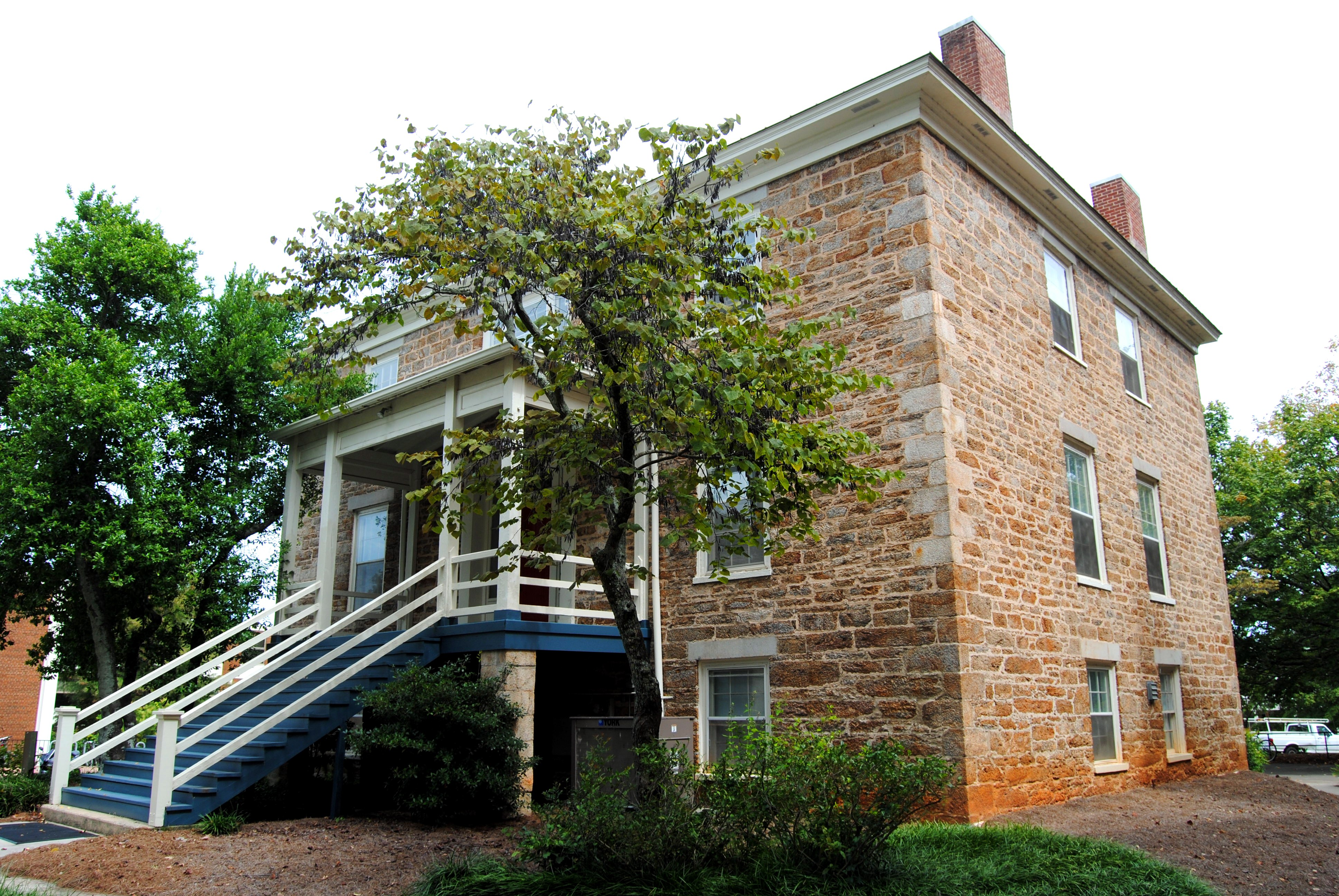
Lumpkin House on Cedar Street on the UGA campus

Lumpkin House, also known as "Rock House", is the oldest building on South Campus, built in 1844. The building is named after its original owner, Wilson Lumpkin, the former Georgia congressman, governor, and U.S. senator who designed and built the house as his retirement home. In 1970, the building was added to the National Register of Historic Places. The second-oldest building, named after the state legislator James J. Conner, sits on one of the highest points in Athens. Built in the Renaissance Revival style, Conner Hall also serves the CAES. Barrow Hall, built in 1911, is the third-oldest building in South Campus and serves a variety of academic programs. Originally known as the Farm Mechanics Building, the building was renamed after Chancellor David C. Barrow, during whose tenure it was constructed.

Home to the College of Family and Consumer Sciences, Dawson Hall was built in 1932 to house the university's growing home economics department, then part of the College of Agriculture. In 1971, the school added an annex to Dawson Hall and later renamed it after Mary Spiers who was dean of the School of Home Economics from 1954 to 1971. The College of Family and Consumer Sciences also has five other buildings, built in 1939 and 1940, known collectively as the McPhaul Center.

On the curved hill between Dawson Hall and Sanford Stadium, a plan envisioned in 1953, proposed the construction of a Science Center to house the university's various scientific programs. Between 1959 and 1960, six buildings were constructed to each house studies in physics, Food Sciences, Geography–Geology, Chemistry, Biological Sciences, and Poultry Science. Located south of the Food Sciences Building, the Museum of Natural History manages several collections of artifacts and specimens from archaeology, biology, geology, and paleontology located throughout the buildings on campus. The Science Library was built south of Dawson Hall in 1968 to supplement the Science Center complex. Containing a thirteen-feet and over-2,500-pound skeleton of a giant North American ground sloth, a foyer connects the Science Library with the Boyd Graduate Studies Building also built in 1968.

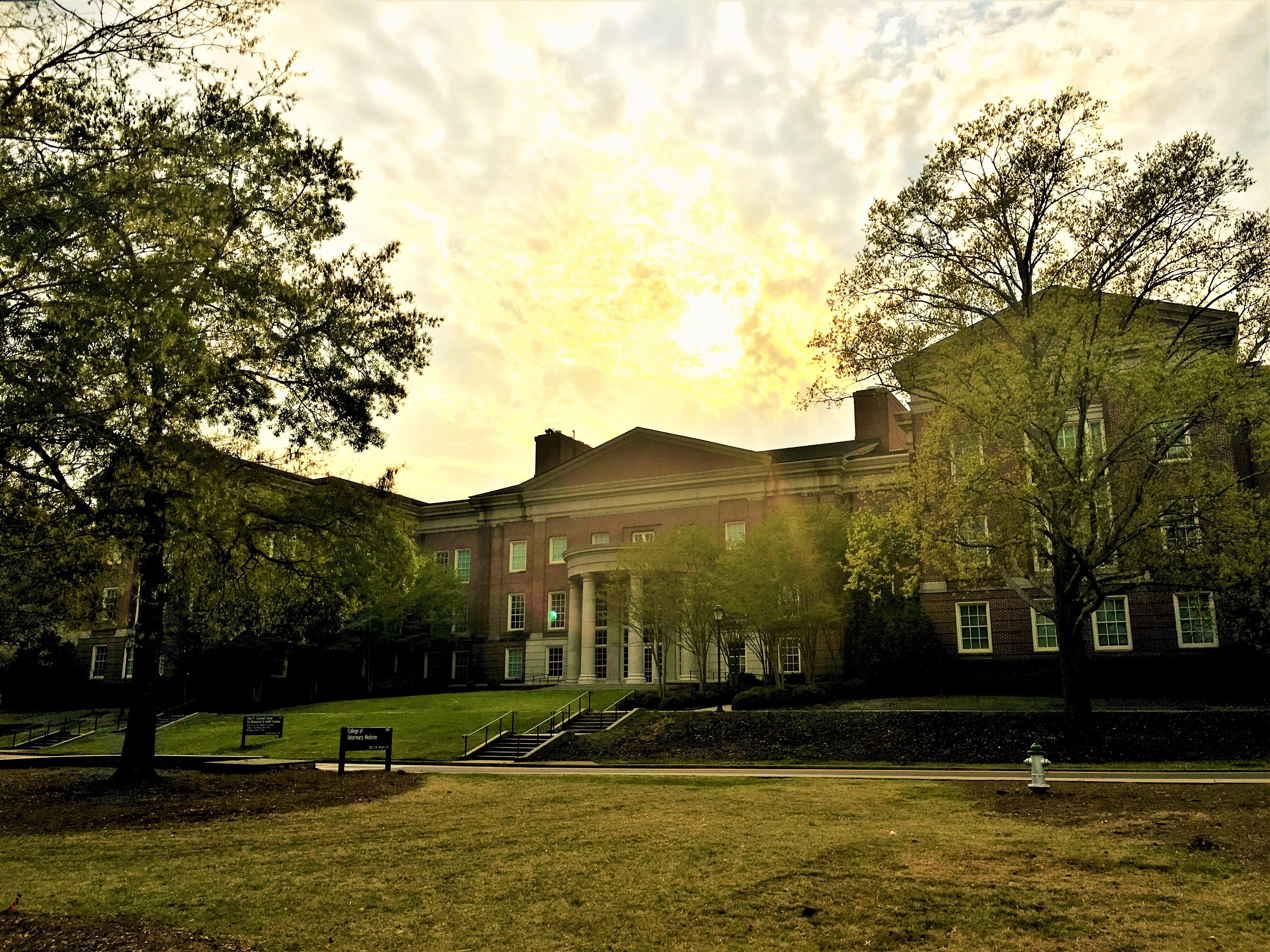
Paul D. Coverdell Center for Biomedical and Health Sciences

Named after U.S. Senator Paul D. Coverdell, the Paul D. Coverdell Center for Biomedical and Health Sciences is a $40-million facility with 172,180 square feet (16,000 m^{2}) of space, giving enough room for about 275 scientists, staff and graduate students. The center was specifically designed to maximize energy efficiency and it was built with local and recycled materials. Laboratory intensive groups at the Coverdell Center include the Center for Tropical and Emerging Global Diseases, and the Biomedical Health Sciences Institute. Former President George H. W. Bush spoke at the center's grand opening in 2006. In 2016, the university also opened the Science Learning Center, a 116,000-square-foot (10,800 m^{2}) facility located near Stegeman Coliseum.

The Driftmier Engineering Center, named after a campus engineer and the head of the former Agricultural Engineering Division of the College of Agriculture. Partnering with Roy Hitchcock, Rudolph H. Driftmier was responsible for the design and construction of 15 buildings on campus from 1930 to 1965. The 110,000-square-foot (10,000 m^{2}) building renamed after Driftmier in 1982 was constructed in 1966 and is now home to the College of Engineering.

The Georgia Center for Continuing Education & Hotel is also located on South Campus. The building hosts many seminars and conferences every year. The Georgia Center was built in 1957. The center is also home to the WUGA, an affiliate of the National Public Radio.

=== Central Campus ===
Bounded by Lumpkin Street to the west and East Campus Road to the east, Central Campus was developed on the remaining woodland area between the larger and older North and South Campuses. Development began in 1910 with Memorial Hall which remained unfinished until 1925 due to financial constraints. Originally envisioned as a student athletic facility and constructed with a swimming pool and gymnasium, Memorial Hall has served a wide variety of purposes before becoming home to the offices of the vice president of student affairs and several other administrative offices. Several former athletic facilities were located in this area before they were replaced by newer academic buildings, student life centers, and residence halls. Of these athletic facilities, only Sanford Stadium remains and continues to dominate Central Campus.

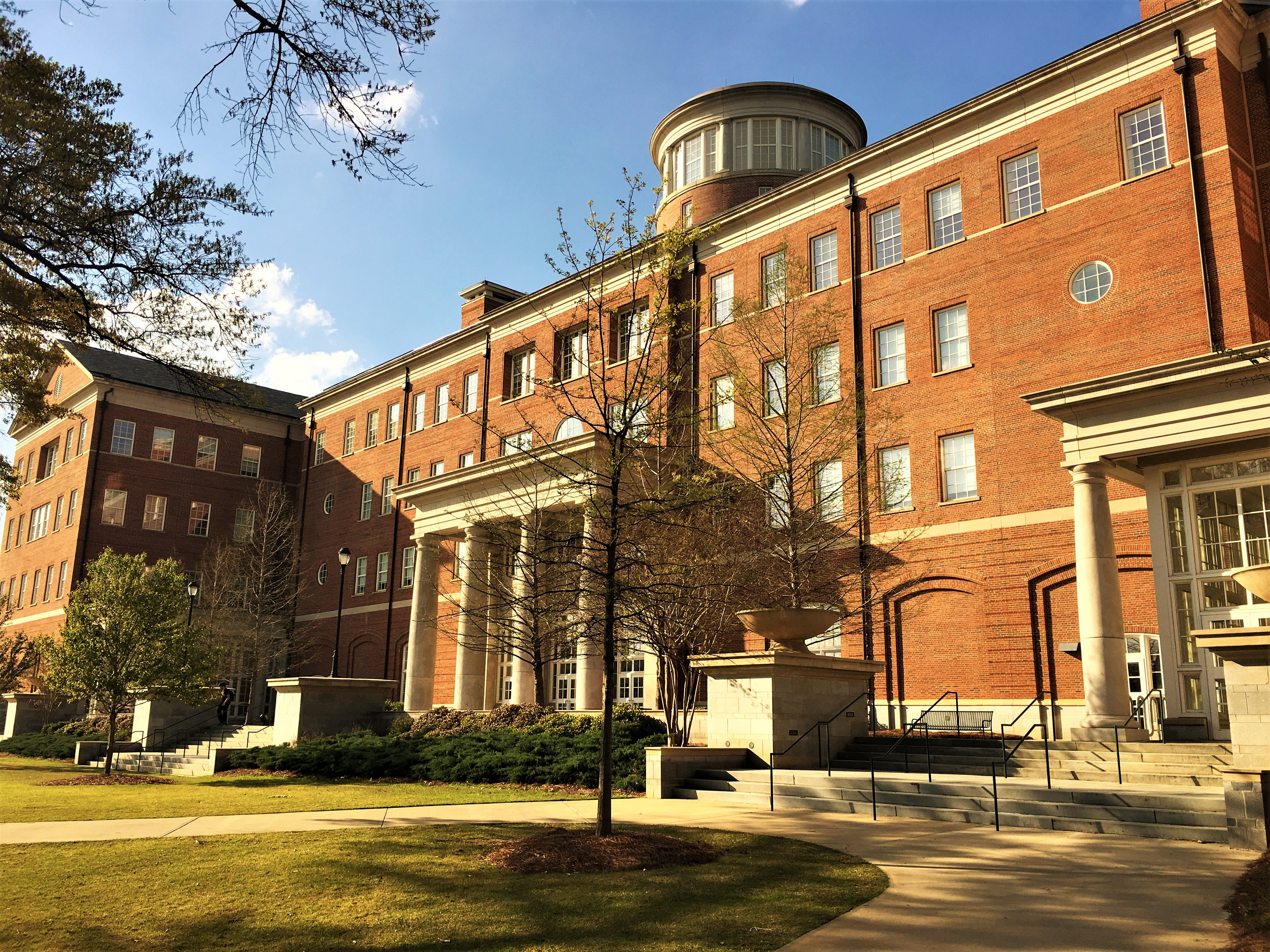
Zell B. Miller Learning Center

Located in the northwest corner, the Fine Arts Building was modeled in the neoclassical architectural style and built in 1941 with funds from the Public Works Administration, part of the New Deal initiated in the 1930s. The building covers an area about the size of a city block, and the interior features a giant mural by French-American artist Jean Charlot. At the time of its construction, it was the largest and most expensive academic building on campus. The Zell B. Miller Learning Center became the largest academic building in Central Campus when it was built in 2003 with a footprint of 6.5 acres (2.6 hectares). With 26 classrooms and lecture halls and a total of 2,200 seats, the Learning Center is also probably the most heavily used by students. In 2009, the building was renamed in honor of UGA alumnus Zell B. Miller who went on to serve as the 79th governor of Georgia and later as the U.S. senator from Georgia. Another heavily used building is the Dean Tate Student Center built in 1983 and expanded in 2009. The LEED Gold-certified building features a green roof and 75,000 gallon cistern to catch rainwater for use in irrigation and flushing toilets. The building was named after William Tate, the former dean of men.

The Psychology and Journalism Building was built on grounds which formerly housed the university's tennis courts and gymnasium, Woodruff Hall. In 1967, a $6.1 million construction project created the building to house two of the largest departments at the university, the psychology department, part of the Franklin College of Arts and Sciences, and the Henry W. Grady College of Journalism and Mass Communication, named after the former editor of The Atlanta Constitution. Other buildings in the area include Clark Howell Hall, built in 1937 as a dormitory but which later became home to the UGA Career Center, and the UGA Bookstore built in 1968.

=== West Campus ===
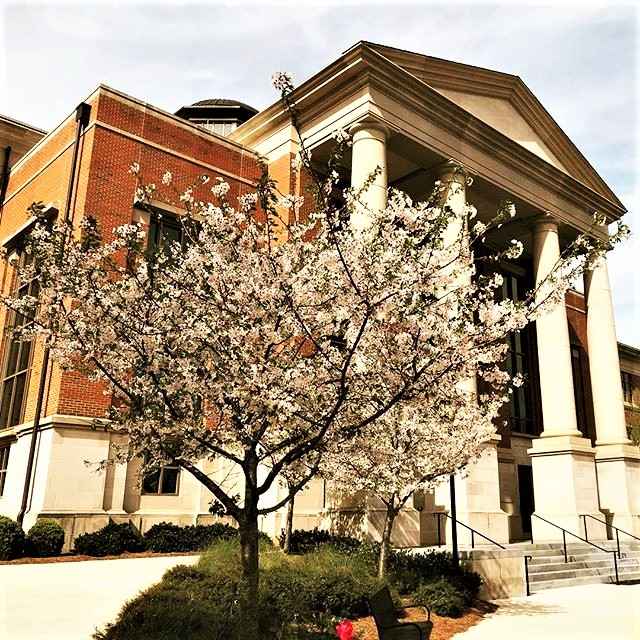
Richard B. Russell Jr. Special Collections Libraries Building

Several residential halls are located in what is known as West Campus. It is made up of eight residence halls built in the 1960s and a pre-existing private residence hall, Oglethorpe House, which the university purchased in 1979. Lipscomb Hall, Mell Hall, Creswell Hall, Russell Hall, Brumby Hall, Hill Hall, Church Hall, and Boggs Hall are all named after former UGA presidents, deans, and administrators. Other notable buildings west of the campus include the Wray-Nicholson House, which was built in 1825, named after two businessmen who previously occupied the house and now home to the UGA Alumni Association; The Richard B. Russell Jr. Special Collections Libraries Building, built in 2012, was named after the former Georgia governor and senator, and currently houses the Hargrett Rare Book and Manuscript Library, including the University Archives; the Richard B. Russell Jr. Library for Political Research and Studies; and the Walter J. Brown Media Archives and Peabody Awards Collection.

In 2013, the university began construction on Terry College of Business Complex. A total of six buildings were to be completed in a three-phase construction project. The first phase completed in 2015 led to the opening of Correll Hall. Phase II was completed in September 2017, opening Amos Hall, Benson Hall and Moore-Rooker Hall. All of the buildings were named after major contributors to the business school. Construction then began on the third phase of the project in 2018 to include two more buildings named Ivester and Orkin Hall which were completed in 2020.

=== East Campus ===
The newest addition to the campus, East Campus is demarcated by College Station Road to the south, East Campus Road to the west, River Road to the north and stretches to the Athens Perimeter or Loop 10 to the east. Its most northern building is the Performing Arts Center. Its main concert hall, the 1,100-seat Hodgson Hall, has hosted the performances of notable orchestras such the Royal Philharmonic and the St. Petersburg Philharmonic, and regularly hosts seasonal performances by the Atlanta Symphony Orchestra. The center also holds the smaller Ramsey Hall, which stages performances by solo and small chamber groups.

East Campus is also home to the Lamar Dodd School of Art and the Georgia Museum of Art located just south of the Performing Arts Center. The museum's collection began with a donation of paintings by American artists from the art collector Alfred Heber Holbrook who developed a close friendship with the head of UGA Art Department, Lamar Dodd. Holbrook subsequently moved to Athens to become the museum's director, donated more than 900 works, and served as director for 25 years. In 1982, the Georgia General Assembly designated the museum as the official state museum of art. The current building in which the museum is located was built in 1996 and expanded in 2011. The building received a Gold LEED certification its "use of materials and construction strategies to achieve environmental sustainability."

The Ramsey Student Physical Activities Center is located on East Campus. It was built in 1995 and named in honor of Eugenia A. and Bernard Ramsey. The building has a footprint larger than Sanford Stadium and is the largest single structure on UGA's campus. The Ramsey Center has three gyms, three pools (one Olympic-sized, a 17-foot (5.2 m) diving well, and a lap pool), a 1/8-mile (200 m) indoor suspended rubberized track, a 44-foot (13 m) high climbing wall, 14-foot (4.3 m) outdoor bouldering wall, ten racquetball courts, two squash courts, bicycle repair stands, eight full-length basketball courts, and 19,000 square feet (1,770 m^{2}) of weight-training space. The Ramsey Center also contains the Gabrielsen Natatorium, home to the university's varsity swimming and diving programs.

Located south of the Ramsey Center, the University Health Center provides health services to the university's student and faculty with a staff of more than 200 health professionals.

=== Off-campus facilities ===
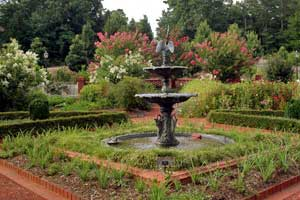
A fountain in the State Botanical Garden of Georgia

The State Botanical Garden of Georgia is a 313-acre preserve set aside by the University of Georgia in 1968 for the study and enjoyment of flora, fauna and geographic systems. Located three miles south of campus, it is a living laboratory serving educational, research, recreational, and public service roles for the University of Georgia. The garden contains a number of specialized theme gardens and collections, over five miles of nature trails, and four major facilities including a tropical conservatory. In 1984, the Georgia General Assembly designated the area as Georgia's official botanical garden.

Delta Hall is the UGA facility in the Capitol Hill neighborhood on the east side of Stanton Park in Washington, D.C. The facility, which was purchased by the UGA Foundation with a Delta Air Lines grant in 2013, transformed the 20,000-square-foot (1,900 m^{2}) space into a residence hall and learning community where students and faculty can spend a semester at a time in Washington, D.C.

The university's year-round residential study-abroad program is held at Trinity College of Oxford University in England, where students and faculty study, learn and teach at Trinity College and live in a three-story Victorian house near the heart of the city.

The University of Georgia also owns one other international residential center in Cortona, Italy. The university previously owned a residential center in Monteverde, Costa Rica, sold it in 2019, but it still serves students from UGA and other colleges and universities.

Oconee Forest Park, Lake Herrick, and the Herrick Creek Loop are facilities for use and enjoyment of UGA students and staff. Lake Herrick was commissioned by the School in 1982 as a recreational resource for UGA. Besides recreation, the area is used as a living laboratory for research and as an interdisciplinary outdoor classroom for faculty and students in visual arts, communication studies, ecology, engineering, forestry and natural resources, landscape architecture, and other fields.

The 56-acre UGA Health Sciences Campus has a landscaped green space with more than 400 trees and several historic buildings. The Health Sciences Campus include classrooms, rooms for small group and clinical skills teaching, lab space for gross anatomy, pathology and histology, a medical library, and faculty offices. The administration is housed in Winnie Davis Hall, which was built in 1902. In the construction phase is a $100 million facility set to open in 2026 to provide training for at least 120 University of Georgia medical students.

UGA has facilities in almost every county in Georgia. The university has extended campuses in Atlanta and Gwinnett County, as well as Griffin and Tifton. The University of Georgia operates five 4-H centers around the state: Fortson 4-H Center, in the southern Atlanta metropolitan area, Jekyll Island 4-H Center and Tybee Island 4-H Center on the Georgia coast, Rock Eagle 4-H Center in Eatonton, and Wahsega 4-H Center in the North Georgia mountains. The university is also responsible for two other land holdings. These centers, operated in part by the University of Georgia College of Agricultural and Environmental Sciences, serve as educational facilitates for youth. Georgia 4-H specializes in educating young people about agricultural and environmental issues, agriculture awareness, leadership, communication skills, foods and nutrition, health, energy conservation, and citizenship.

=== Other athletic facilities ===
Built for $360,000 to replace the former Sanford Field in nearby Central Campus, Sanford Stadium was inaugurated on October 12, 1929, with a 15–0 victory over the Yale Bulldogs football team. Originally constructed to accommodate 30,000 fans, a double deck addition in 1967 added 19,000 more seats, and a 1981 addition to encircle the field added another 19,000 seats. After several more renovations, the stadium now holds more than 93,000 spectators, making it one of the largest collegiate stadiums in the country and the thirteenth largest stadium in the world. The stadium is named for Steadman Sanford, a former president of the university and chancellor of the University System of Georgia. Besides being the home of the Georgia Bulldogs football team, the stadium also serves as an event venue, the location of undergraduate graduation ceremonies, and was used for the medal competition of men's and women's Olympic football (soccer) at the 1996 Summer Olympics.

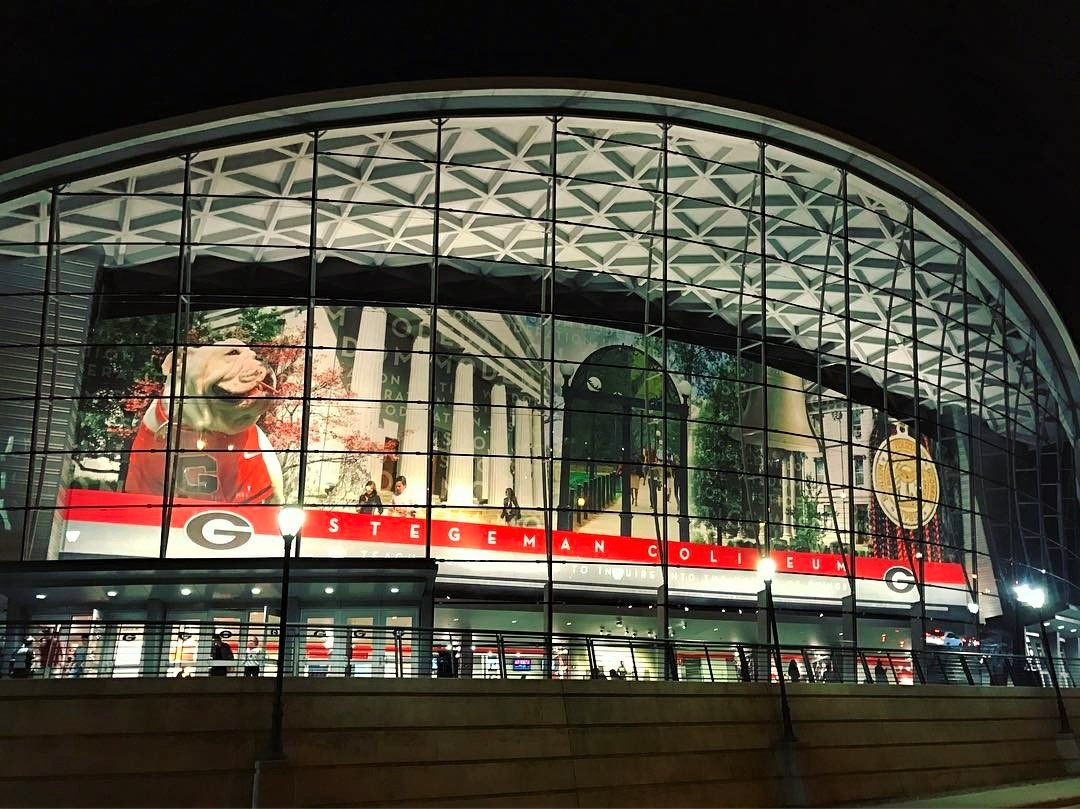
Stegeman Coliseum at UGA hosted 1996 Summer Olympics events.

UGA's other athletic facilities are located in South Campus. The South Campus athletic complex consists of the Foley Baseball Field, Butts–Mehre Heritage Hall, Woodruff Practice Fields, (both used by the football team), William Porter Payne Indoor Athletic Facility (for indoor football and other sport practices), Stegeman Coliseum, the Coliseum Training Facility, and Spec Towns Track. Built in 1964, Stegeman Coliseum is one of the oldest college basketball, gymnastics and volleyball venues in the South. Named after the former football coach Herman J. Stegeman and home to the Georgia Bulldogs basketball, Georgia Lady Bulldogs basketball, the women's gymnastics program, Georgia Gymdogs, and the women's volleyball teams, Bulldogs Volleyball, the Coliseum has a seating capacity of 10,523.

The basketball, volleyball, and gymnastics teams also have a practice facility in the adjacent Coliseum Training Facility. Stegeman Coliseum was the venue for the 1996 Summer Olympics Volleyball and Rhythmic Gymnastics,

A large black marble Olympics Monument on the west lawn of Stegeman Coliseum, erected in preparation for the 1996 Summer Olympics, commemorates the more than 115 UGA students who participated in the Olympics, including Forrest "Spec" Towns. The Spec Towns Track located nearby was constructed in 1964 and is home to UGA's track and field teams.

The Dan Magill Tennis Complex, located south of Stegeman Coliseum, includes sixteen tennis courts with seating for a total of about 5,000 spectators.

UGA also has its own University Golf Course that is a par 71 Robert Trent Jones designed golf course.

== Academics ==
=== Undergraduate admissions ===
Undergraduate admissions statistics
- 2026 entering class
- Admit rate: 29.8 (▼ −17.2)
- Yield rate: 43.6 (▲ +4.9)

Test scores middle 50%
- SAT Total: 1360–1500
- ACT Composite: 31-34

High school GPA
- Average: 4.26

The university considers many factors in admissions decisions: high school grades, particularly the rigor of high school study—a student's studying in a school's "advanced" or "most difficult" curriculum, taking of advanced placement, College Board Advanced Placement, International Baccalaureate, early college enrollment and other rigorous classes; scores on standardized tests (SAT or ACT); academic and personal achievements; extracurricular activities; the mandatory school counselor evaluation letter as well academic letters of recommendation from teachers; the student's personal statement. University admissions are need-blind for domestic applicants.

As a state university, UGA automatically admits applicants that graduate first or second in their class at an SACS-accredited high school in Georgia. For others who go through the traditional application process, based on the report of the U.S. Department of Education National Center for Education Statistics, UGA is considered to have "Very High" undergraduate admissions standards with "High" applicant completion. The Princeton Review gives the university an "Admissions Selectivity Rating" of 96 out of 99. The ACT Assessment Student Report places UGA student admissions in the "highly selective" category, the highest category. In the 2020–2021 academic year, 69 freshman students were National Merit Scholars.

In 2023, the university received 43,416 applications. It extended offers of admission to 16,729 applicants, or 37.2%. 6,150 accepted students chose to enroll at the university, a yield rate of 38.1%. Of the 70% of incoming students in 2023 who submitted SAT scores, the interquartile range was 1230–1410 with an average of 1320; of the 47% of incoming students in 2023 who submitted ACT scores, the interquartile range was 27–32 with an average of 29. Of all matriculating students, the average high school GPA was 4.14. The average enrolled student had completed an average of ten Advanced Placement, International Baccalaureate, or college duel-enrollment courses in high school.

For the class beginning in fall 2025, the university received nearly 48,000 applications. It extended offers of admission to 15,800 applicants, or 32.9%. Of admitted students, the middle 50% had a core GPA between 4.08-4.35, SAT scores between 1,300-1,470 and ACT scores between 30-34, while taking 8-14 AP, IB, or dual enrollment courses. The accepted students cumulatively occupied more than 16,500 volunteering roles and over 23,000 leadership roles.

Incoming students include those from every state and Washington, D.C. and 57 countries around the world. Among admitted students in the class of 2024, 20% were out-of-state, and the top three states other than Georgia were California, Florida, and Maryland.

Fall First-Time Freshman Statistics
	2025	2024	2023	2022	2021	2020	2019	2018	2017	2016
Applicants	47,860	43,090	43,700	39,615	39,090	28,024	29,065	26,027	24,165	22,694
Admits	14,262	15,900	15,340	16,600	15,689	13,549	13,261	12,659	13,052	12,232
Admit rate	29.8	37	35.1	41.9	40.1	48.3	45.6	48.6	54.0	53.9
Enrolled	6,216	6,169	6,200	6,200	5,819	5,646	5,499	5,727	5,826	5,433
Yield rate	43.6	38.7	40.4	37.3	37.1	41.7	41.5	45.2	44.6	44.4
ACT composite* (out of 36)	30-34	29-34	29-34	31-34	28–32 (31%^{†})	27–32 (63%^{†})	27–32 (63%^{†})	27–32 (67%^{†})	26–31 (74%^{†})	26–31 (72%^{†})
SAT composite* (out of 1600)	1300-1470	1280-1470	1270-1470	1350-1480	1280–1430 (36%^{†})	1220–1390 (68%^{†})	1240–1400 (70%^{†})	1240–1410 (69%^{†})	1200–1370 (68%^{†})	—
* middle 50% range^{†} percentage of first-time freshmen who chose to submit| Due to COVID-19, SAT and ACT test score submissions were optional for 2021. For fall 2022 admits and beyond test scores were required

=== Teaching and scholarship ===
The university has a student-to-faculty ratio of 17 students per faculty member, and 46 percent of its classes have fewer than 20 students. The university has 401 endowed professorships. The average freshman retention rate is 95 percent, and 90% of students complete their degrees within six years, making UGA one of just nine public universities in the nation to meet this status. Further, 95% of graduates are either employed or enrolled in graduate school within six months of graduation. As of 2024, the university is ranked five stars out of five and in the top 37 out of 439 Best National Universities in the United States for "Best Undergraduate Teaching" as scored by U.S. News & World Report.

As an adjunct to classroom, laboratory, clinical, and experiential learning, in 2009 the university began to provide a new online learning system, the eLearning Commons (eLC), that is exploitable by both students and faculty. eLC is unique, jointly supplied and supported by the university's Center for Teaching and Learning and Enterprise Information Technology Services, and is part of the university's digital technology in education program. The system includes discussion boards, workspaces, polling, communication and announcements, course materials, learning activities and resources, critical thinking prompts, assignments, quizzes, submission grading, and learning progress tracking.

As of 2024, 29 UGA students have been named Rhodes Scholars including eleven since 2008. The University of Georgia is one of the nation's top producers of Rhodes Scholars over the past three decades. UGA is also home to hundreds of other major scholarship winners including 204 Fulbright Scholars (the most of any U.S. university, exceeding universities such as Stanford), 62 Goldwater Scholars, 74 Boren Scholars, 22 Truman Scholars, 20 Udall Scholars, six Gates Cambridge Scholars, nine U.S. State Department Thomas R. Pickering Foreign Affairs Fellowships, eight Schwarzman Scholars, three Mitchell Scholars, three Carnegie Endowment Gaither Fellows, two Soros Fellows, two Beinecke Scholars, two Knight-Hennessy Scholars, a Churchill Scholar, and students earning multiple Marshall Scholarships, Payne Fellowships, Voyager Scholarships, Phi Kappa Phi Fellowships, Quad Fellowships, LAF Ignite Scholarships, and MacArthur Fellowships (known as "Genius Grants"). The University of Georgia has been among only seven of all universities nationwide with recipients of all three of the Goldwater, Truman, and Udall scholarships, and it joined Harvard, Yale, and Brown universities as the only schools with recipients of the most prestigious scholarships awarded to American undergraduates: Rhodes, Marshall, Truman, and Goldwater.

=== Morehead College ===
The University of Georgia has an honors college with only two methods of admission. Applicants applying for early action admission are automatically considered for admissions for the honors college. Incoming freshman also have one opportunity during their first semester to apply for the honors college, with the requirements being that an applicant take a minimum of 14 credit hours of graded (A-F) courses, that they predict they will have a cumulative UGA GPA of at least 3.8 by the end of the semester, and that they receive a letter from the Foundation Fellows or the Ramsey Scholars programs that are housed within Morehead College. For the class of 2030 (enrolling at UGA in August 2026), the average GPA of entering honors freshmen was 4.4, the average SAT score was 1555 out of 1600 and the average ACT Composite score was 35. Based on academic rigor, selective admissions, and comprehensive program benefits methodology, the college was ranked the No. 1 honors program in the United States by College Transitions, publishers of the best-selling guide Colleges Worth Your Money.

Through the Honors College, students are able to participate in early registration for classes and register for special honors-only courses. Honors courses are taught by specially selected faculty with an average class size from 17 to 20 students. Those wishing to graduate with High or Highest Honors must complete a capstone experience consisting of graduate courses, a senior thesis, or a special project prior to graduation. Honors students may elect to reside in the Myers Hall, which is reserved for honors students, or apply to reside in Rutherford Hall of the Franklin Residential College (FRC), a residential college based on the Oxford and Cambridge model. The program allows qualified undergraduates to pursue a curriculum leading to a bachelor's (AB/BS) and a master's (MA/MS) degree in four years. The Honors International Scholars Program (HISP) provides honors students with opportunities to study abroad on paid scholarship and internships.

=== Center for Undergraduate Research Opportunities ===
The Center for Undergraduate Research Opportunities (CURO), which is administered by the Honors Program, promotes opportunities for all of the undergraduate students at the University of Georgia to engage in research with faculty regardless of discipline, major, or GPA. Through in-depth research with faculty members, students can explore questions and issues of interest as lines of inquiry develop through their undergraduate careers, earning academic credit in the process.

=== Study abroad ===
UGA is among the top-ranked universities in the US for the number of students studying abroad, with more than 100 programs in about 70 countries, and 25% of the student body participating in the program before graduation. UGA has faculty study abroad programs on every continent, including Antarctica. Additionally, UGA has signed agreements with several outside study abroad organizations: the American Institute For Foreign Study, GlobaLinks Learning Abroad, the Institute for Study Abroad (IFSA), International Studies Abroad (ISA), The School for Field Studies, and the Innsbruck International Summer School. Just over 2,000 students, or 6% of the entire campus enrollment (graduate and undergraduate) study abroad in a given year.

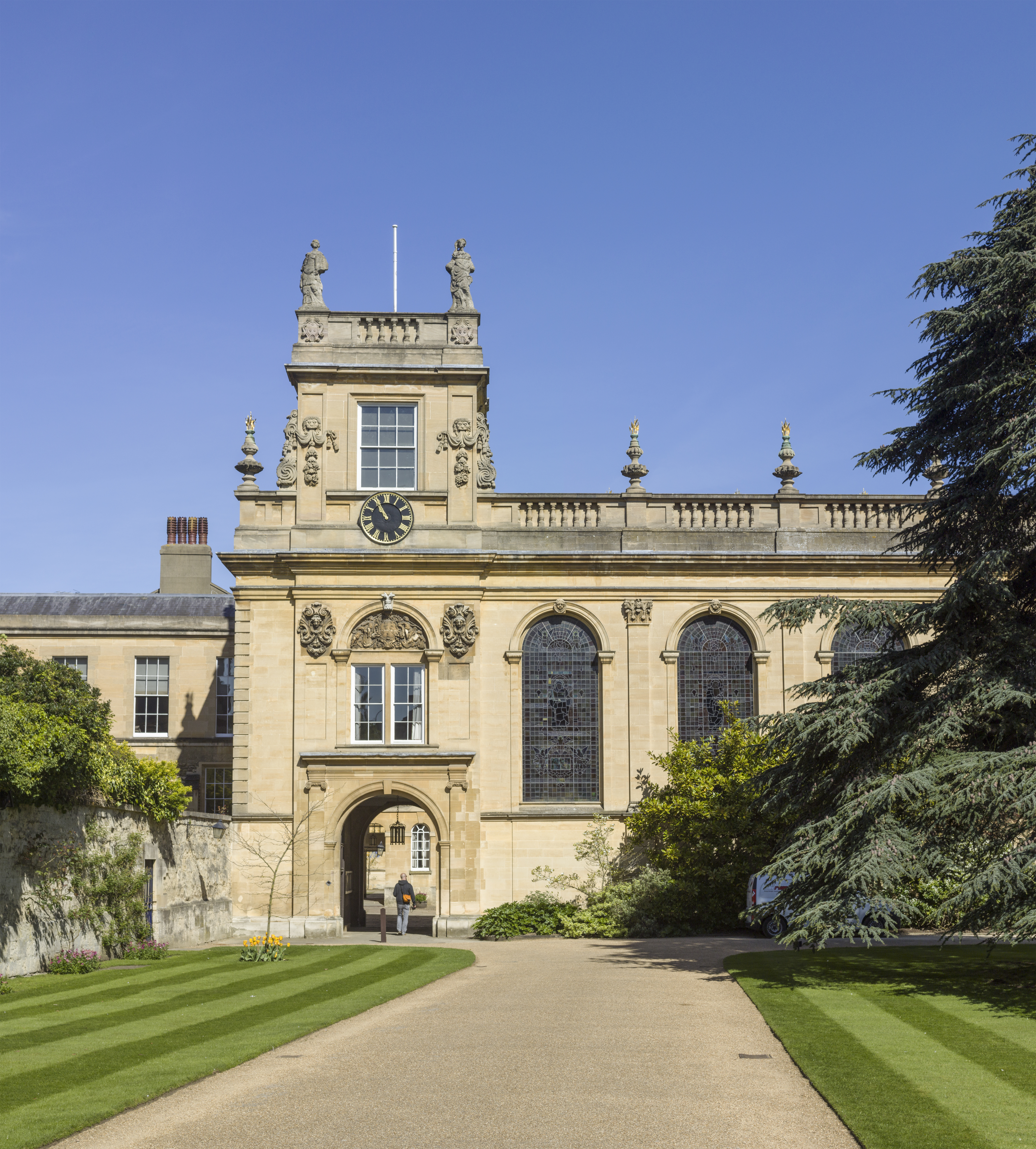
UGA students reside in Trinity College while at Oxford University

The university began its first year-round residential study-abroad program at Trinity College of Oxford University in England, where students and faculty live in a three-story Victorian house owned by UGA and located in the heart of the city of Oxford. Founded in 1987, the UGA at Oxford program began as a summer option and expanded to include spring in 1994. With the purchase of the house in 1999, the program became available throughout the academic year.

The University of Georgia owns another international residential center in Cortona, Italy, and has access to a large center in Monteverde, Costa Rica along with other universities. The Costa Rica campus comprises 155 acres (0.63 km^{2}) and over 36,000 square feet (3,300 m^{2}) of built space nestled in the country's mountainous Monteverde Cloud Forest. In 2012, the Certification for Sustainable Tourism (CST) program in Costa Rica recognized the campus in Costa Rica as one of its "Four Leaves" level institutions operating in the country. Run by the Costa Rican Tourism Board, the CST awards excellence in natural, cultural, and social resource management.

=== Rankings ===
Academic rankings

National
- Forbes: 69
- U.S. News & World Report: 46 (tie)
- Washington Monthly: 93
- WSJ/College Pulse: 143

Global
- ARWU: 201–300
- QS: 525
- THE: 351-400
- U.S. News & World Report: 345 (tie)

For 2025, U.S. News & World Report ranked Georgia's undergraduate program tied for 46th out of 443 Best National Universities, tied for 30th of Most Innovative Schools, tied for 27th in Best Undergraduate Teaching, and tied for 16th among 227 Top Public National Universities. For 2019–2020 worldwide ranked universities, Georgia is ranked in the top 20% of the 1,000 top ranked universities in the entire world by the Center for World University Rankings, is ranked as an A+ university, and in the top 12% of top world universities ranked by University Ranking by Academic Performance based on indicators of research performance, and is ranked 79th of the top 200 universities in the entire world in the uniRank University Ranking. In 2025, a new college rankings system by the editorial board of The Wall Street Journal that evaluated 100 prominent public and private colleges in the United States ranked Georgia as a top ten university including being ranked No. 1 in the nation for curricular rigor as well as recognition for faculty teaching quality, value added to education, and student outcomes with a specific acknowledgement of the university for “strong economic outcomes”. The university is listed as a "Public Ivy" in Greene's Guides as "successfully competing with the Ivy League schools in academic rigor ... attracting superstar faculty and competing for the best and brightest students of all races." The Princeton Review named the university as one of its "Top 10 Best Value Public Colleges" with UGA being one of the colleges designated as a best overall bargain based on cost and financial aid among the most academically outstanding colleges in the nation, also being ranked No.8 in best alumni network, No.10 in access to financial aid, and No.16 in intern placement. Kiplinger ranked the University 12th in its list of the "100 Best Values in Public Colleges", and Forbes ranked the university No.18 among all of the USA's public universities. SmartMoney, a publication by The Wall Street Journal, named UGA as having the fourth best salary return on tuition. The Daily Beast named the university in its "25 Amazing Colleges" listing. Niche ranks UGA as an overall A+ university and a top 10 national public university out of 668 including high rankings for individual subjects taught at the university as well as ranking it No.2 of 1,579 colleges in Best Student Life, No.10 of 1,417 colleges in Best College Campuses, No.13 of 1,385 colleges in Best College Food, and overall No.10 of 132 colleges in Best Big Colleges.

In the 2019–2020 ranking, the American Council of Trustees and Alumni ranked the University of Georgia one of only 23 “A” colleges and universities (grading was “A” through “F”) in its What Will They Learn? study, an evaluation of the curricula of 1,070 U.S. colleges and universities.

In 2022, the Association of American Medical Colleges ranked UGA 7th in the U.S. among undergraduate institutions supplying applicants to medical school, including 7th for the most white applicants, 10th for the most African American applicants, 23rd for the most Asian applicants, and 50th for the most Hispanic and Latino American applicants.

The University of Georgia School of Public and International Affairs was ranked fourth in the nation, while the Public Management Administration program was ranked first by U.S. News & World Report in 2019. The school has had a top ten ranking for over two decades. The Academic Ranking of World Universities has ranked the school seventh in the world.

In 2019, the university was ranked fifth in the entire nation in terms of number of Congressional staffers produced out of undergraduate universities.

For the 2018–2019 season, a team from the University of Georgia was the top university varsity debate team in the United States in both the American Debate Association and the National Debate Tournament team rankings. For the 2025–2026 season, a university team defeated over 800 other teams as champions of the American Mock Trial Association's National Mock Trial Championship Tournament. The university has two of the oldest literary societies in the English-Speaking world focused on extemporaneous debate, the Demosthenian Literary Society and the Phi Kappa Literary Society.

In 2019, Businessweek named the executive MBA program in the university's Terry College of Business 14th in the nation. In 2023, Terry College had eight programs that had top ten rankings. In 2023, PRWeek ranked the university's Advertising and Public Relations program in the top five Outstanding Education Programs in the nation.

In the 2020 ranking, the School of Environment and Design was ranked first among programs for undergraduates in the nation.

According to the study by Law School Transparency, the University of Georgia School of Law is ranked in the top ten nationally for employment outcomes, while the law school has been ranked 13th of the top best law schools by the National Jurist. Georgia Law was ranked 20th of 196 American Bar Association (ABA) approved law schools in the 2023-24 edition of U.S. News & World Report rankings placing it in the top 10% of ABA law schools. The Law School has sent six law clerks to serve justices of the United States Supreme Court in the last twelve years, is fourth among law schools for supplying these clerks for these prestigious Supreme Court positions from 2005 to 2020, and is tenth among all law schools in the country for the total number of federal court clerks accepted from Georgia Law. Serving as a judge's law clerk is considered to be one of the most prestigious positions in legal circles, and tends to open up wide-ranging opportunities in academia, law firm practice, and influential government work. Finally, based on outcome-driven factors such as average indebtedness, bar passage, and employment, Georgia Law has been ranked first as the best value in legal education in the entire United States by the National Jurist.

The College of Veterinary Medicine was ranked tenth in the nation, and College of Pharmacy was ranked 25th in the nation, in the 2019 edition of U.S. News & World Report rankings. Two UGA pharmacy students were selected for the U.S. Navy's Health Services Collegiate Program Medical Service Corps, a selective program that accepted only five recipients from applicants across the country.

University of Georgia's economic impact was $9.2 billion in fiscal year 2025, and the university was awarded the Innovation & Economic Prosperity Award by the Association of Public and Land-grant Universities in recognition of its commitment to community and economic development.

== Research ==
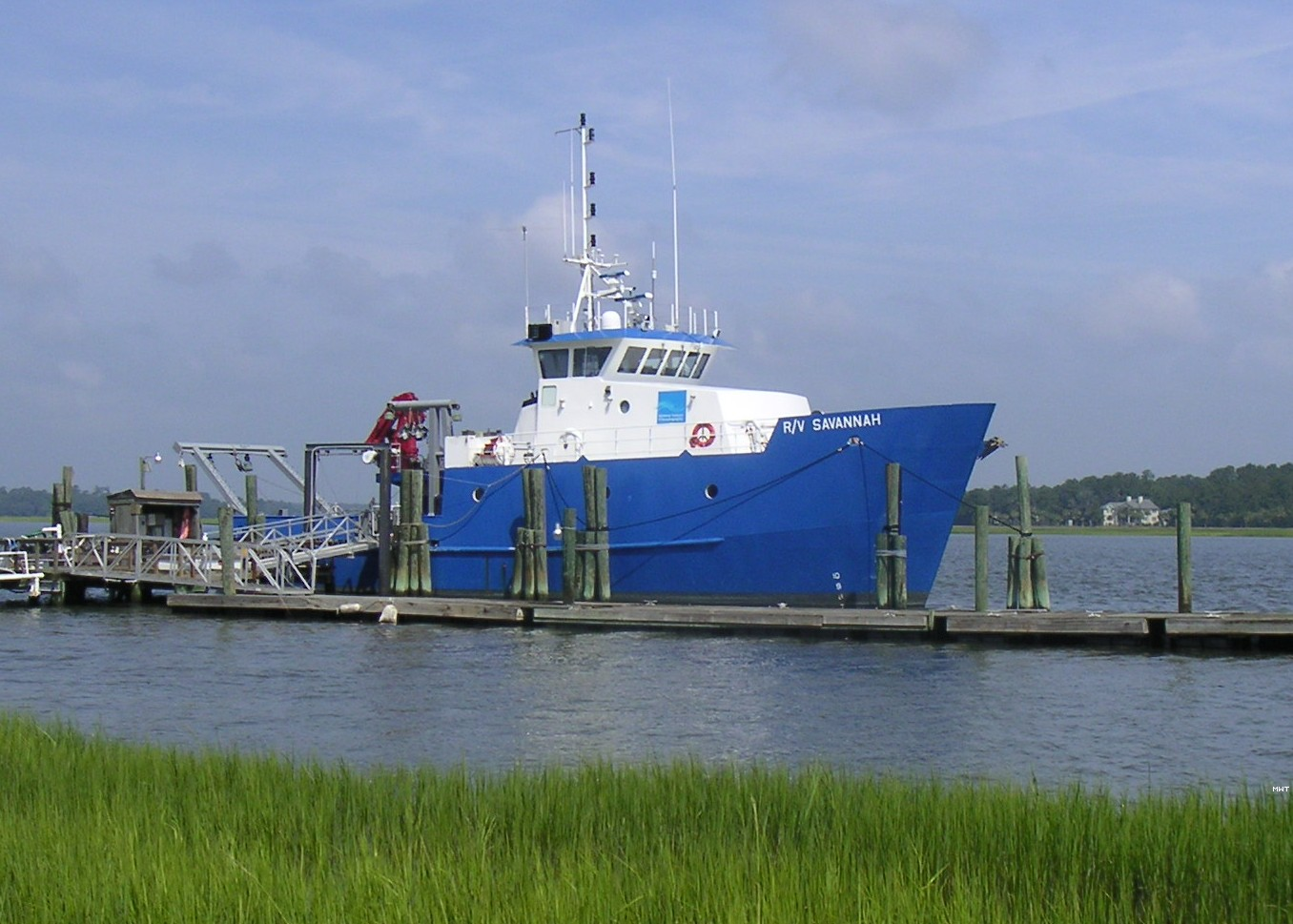
The R/V Savannah research vessel at the Skidaway Institute of Oceanography

The University of Georgia is classified in the highest ranking, "R-1: Doctoral Universities – Highest Research Activity" with "comprehensive" doctoral programs across the arts, sciences, engineering, law, and medicine according to the Carnegie Foundation for the Advancement of Teaching. According to the National Science Foundation, the university spent $495 million on R&D in fiscal year 2020, and the latest report by The Center for Measuring University Performance ranked the University of Georgia 37th among the top research universities in the nation. The university has increased overall research and development funding by 75% since fiscal year 2015 resulting in $654 million in R&D expenditures in fiscal year 2025. In 2024, the university was the No.1 recipient in National Institutes of Health funding for universities without a medical school.

More than 1,200 different products originating from University of Georgia research are on the market. As of 2026, for the fourth consecutive year, the university was ranked No. 1 among all U.S. universities for the number of research-based products brought to market—the university's eleventh consecutive year it was ranked either first or second. The university has never appeared out of the Top 5 of the Association of University Technology Managers rankings. The University of Georgia Research Foundation (UGARF) has over 1000 active licenses with technologies licensed in countries on all continents. In 2020 UGARF held more than 684 US and foreign patents. The University of Georgia consistently ranks in the top ten among all universities for most licenses and options with industry as well as for the most licensing income. As of 2021, based on university research, over 200 companies have been launched by the University of Georgia, placing the university in the top 20 of universities for active startups.

In November 2018, the University of Georgia launched a number of research initiatives funded by a $3 million NSF grant, including a project to transform the school's science education. The university also added a new $143.6 million Interdisciplinary Science, Technology, Engineering, Math (I-STEM) building that was completed in 2023.

Of only 16 universities nationwide, the university is designated an Innovation and Economic Prosperity University recognizing it as a national leader in economic development and innovation and its institution-wide commitment to and strategy for economic engagement, growth, and economic opportunity.

As of 2024, Georgia had 90 research centers and institutes that include the following examples among the many others.

=== Institute of Bioinformatics ===
Founded in fall 2002, the institute is responsible for supporting campus-wide bioinformatics research at the University of Georgia. Institute members conduct bioinformatics research in a wide range of areas, ranging from structural genomics and bioinformatics, plant genomics, microbial genomics, biomedical and cancer bioinformatics and computational and statistical sciences for bioinformatics.

The institute grants Ph.D. and M.S. degrees in bioinformatics as well as a graduate certificate in bioinformatics. In 2012, IOB Director Jessica Kissinger and IOB and Mathematics assistant professor Juan B. Gutierrez joined a collaborative effort on a malaria host-pathogen interaction research center that was awarded up to $19.4 million by a National Institutes of Health contract. The collaborative project is in conjunction with Emory University, Georgia Institute of Technology, Emory's Yerkes National Primate Research Center and the Centers for Disease Control and Prevention (CDC).

=== eHistory ===
Founded in 2011 by History Department faculty, eHistory is a digital collective. Projects include "Mapping the People of Early America," funded by the National Endowment for the Humanities, "CSI:Dixie" funded by the American Council of Learned Societies and the inter-active time lapse map, "The Invasion of America," which shows nearly 500 cessations of Native Lands. The UGA & Slavery site explores the university's entanglements with slavery and legacies in Athens, Georgia. It aligns with the research of institutions across the South that have joined the Universities Studying Slavery consortium.

=== Marine Institute and Skidaway Institute of Oceanography ===
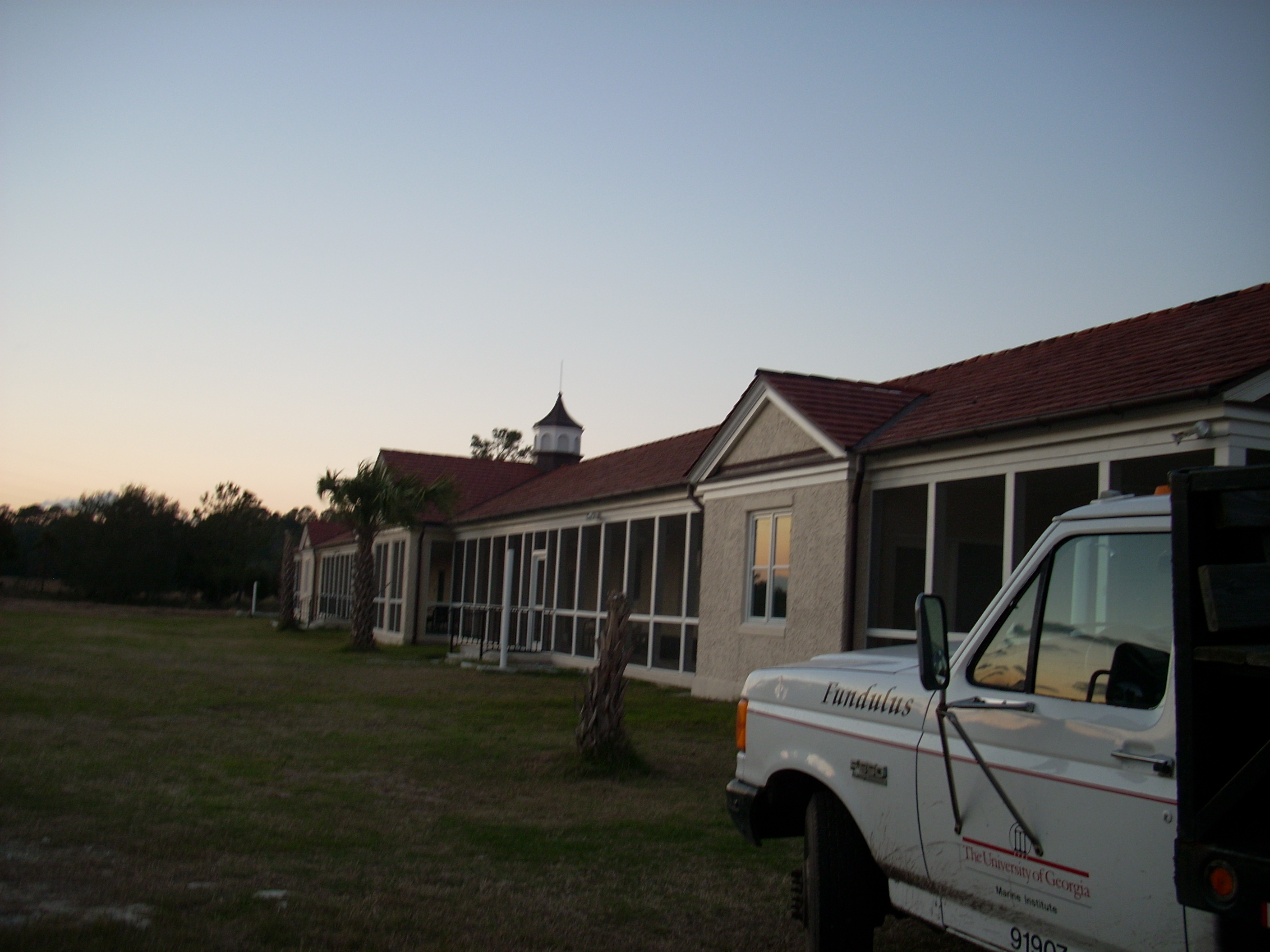
University of Georgia dormitories on Sapelo Island

Sapelo Island, off the Georgia coast, is home to the University of Georgia Marine Institute, a nearshore ecological and geological research institute. The mission of the institute is to support and conduct research on coastal processes involving the unique ecosystems of coastlines.

In 2012, UGA acquired the Skidaway Institute of Oceanography (SkIO), the marine science research institute that was founded in 1968, to join the University of Georgia Marine Institute that was founded in 1953.

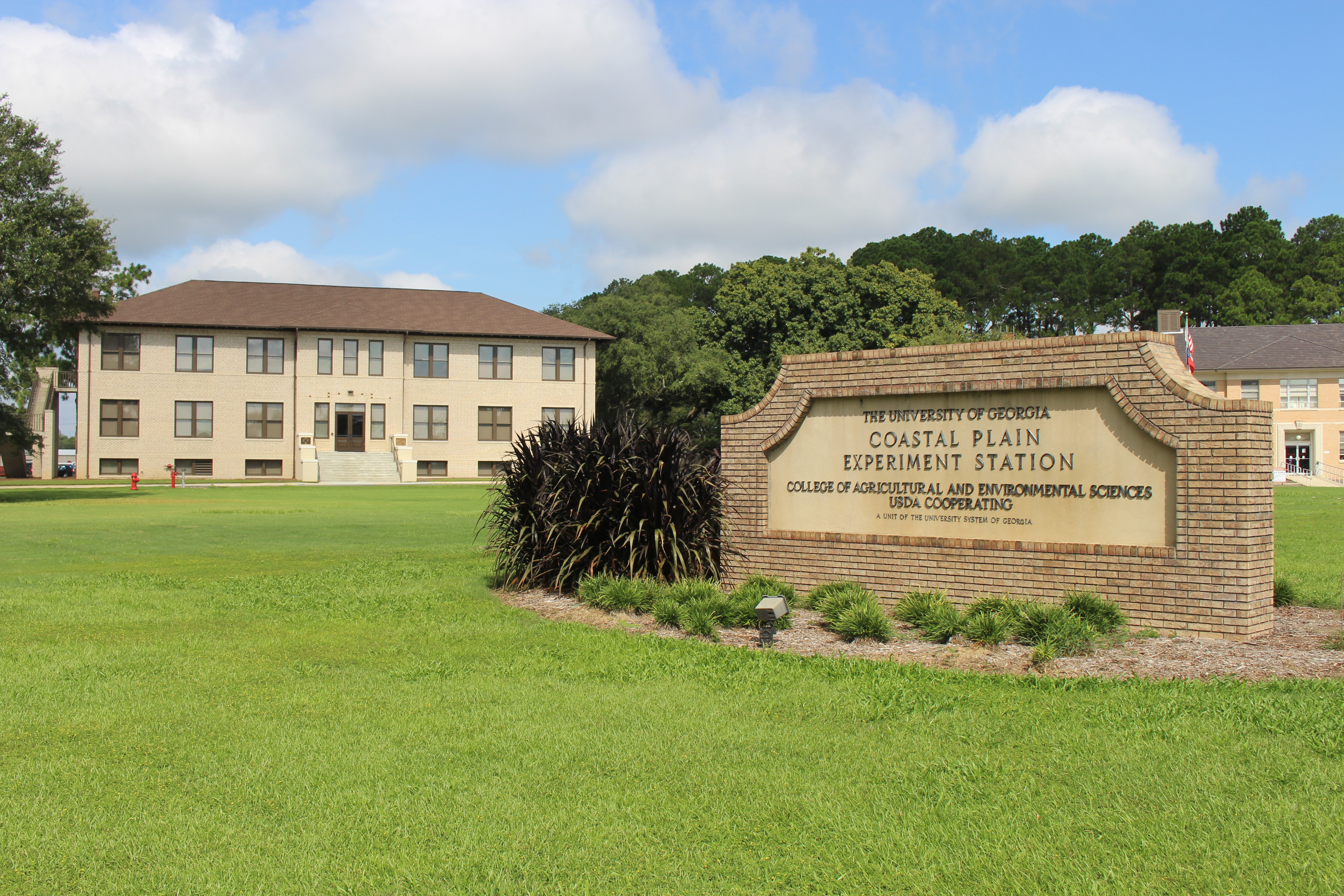
Coastal Plain Experiment Station in Tifton

=== Coastal Plain Research Arboretum ===
The Coastal Plain Research Arboretum (38 acres; 150,000 m^{2}) is an arboretum in Tifton, Georgia, located on the grounds of the Tifton Campus of the University of Georgia.

The arboretum was established in 1987, with plant development and selection starting in 1991. It consists of stream-side forest and wetland, and is dedicated to native plant species of the Georgia coastal plain.

The arboretum contains pine woods, a native azalea collection, and approximately 280 taxa of native trees, shrubs, and herbaceous plants. It is one of several institutions active in efforts to conserve the endangered Torreya taxifolia. The arboretum director is John M. Ruter, professor of horticulture at the university's Tifton campus.

=== Medical school ===
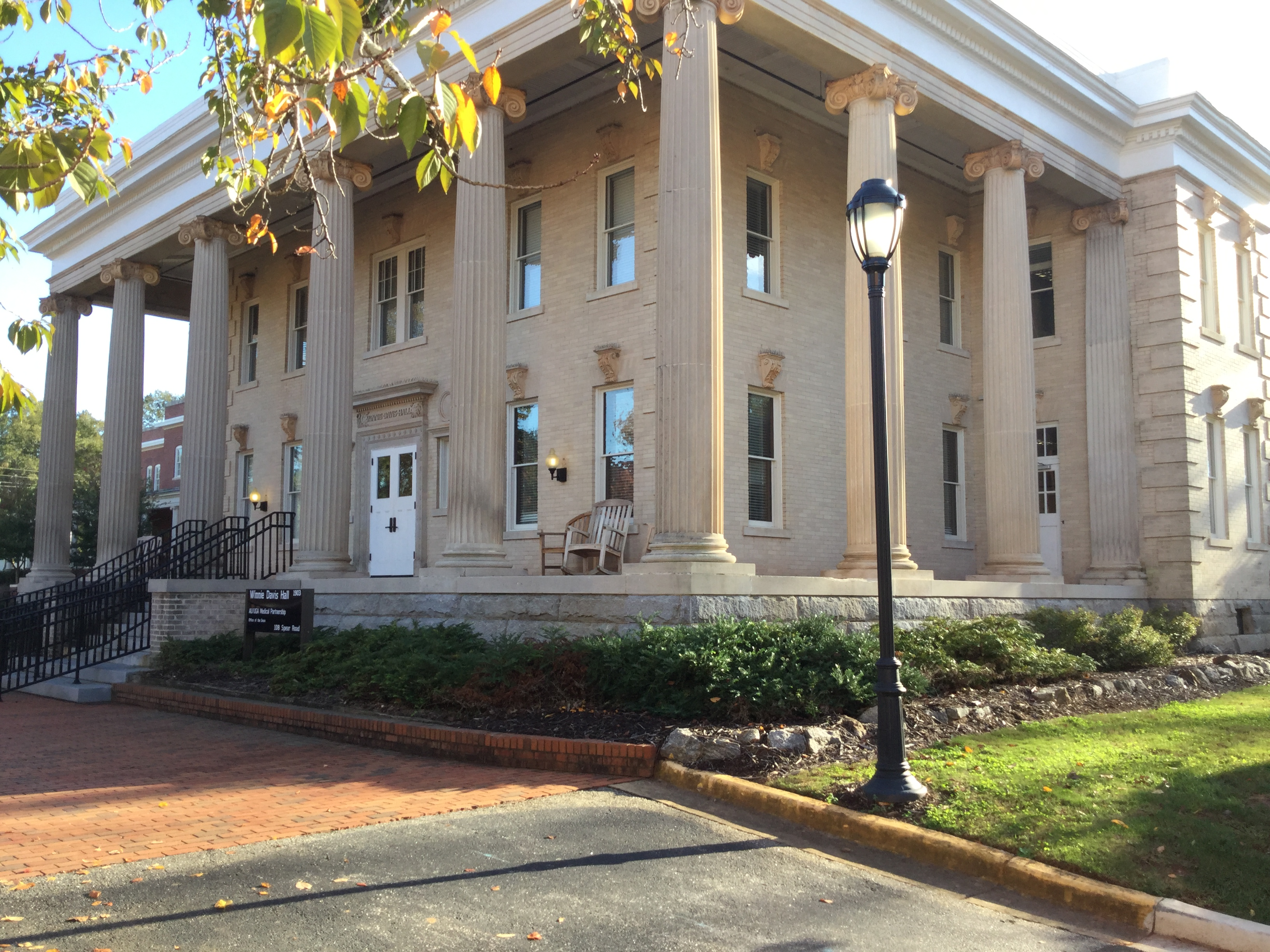
UGA Health Sciences Campus Administration Building – Winnie Davis Hall

In 2010, the University of Georgia partnered with the Medical College of Georgia at Augusta University to create a four-year medical education program in Athens providing for the granting of M.D. degrees at UGA to increase the number of opportunities for excellent students to become qualified physicians, as well as to increase research on disease prevention and treatment. Subsequently, the University of Georgia created its own medical school with the first class entering in the fall of 2026 that will train physicians and nurses. The UGA College of Pharmacy has a satellite campus in Augusta.

First and second-year UGA medical students study medical science and clinical skills in a program that is a hybrid curriculum that makes extensive use of small group learning, supplemented by large group interactive sessions. Then third and fourth-year rotations are provided at private practices, community clinics, and hospitals. In addition to increasing the number of opportunities for excellent students to become qualified physicians, the school will expand research and create new insights by UGA into the prevention and treatment of diseases such as diabetes, heart disease, viral disease, and cancer. UGA medical students, nursing students, graduate students from UGA's College of Public Health, and visiting scholars reside on the University of Georgia's recently reacquired Health Sciences Campus in Athens.

The 56-acre UGA Health Sciences Campus has an extensive landscaped green space with more than 400 trees and many historic buildings. The nearly 63,000 square-feet of building space on the new Health Sciences Campus include large and small classrooms, rooms for small group and clinical skills teaching, lab space for gross anatomy, pathology, histology, etc., a medical library, and faculty offices. The medical program administration is housed in Winnie Davis Hall which was built in 1902.

=== Regenerative Bioscience Center ===
The Regenerative Bioscience Center provides resources, and involves researchers in many disciplines, coming together to develop new cures for diseases and treatment modalities centered around regenerative bioscience and regenerative medicine. Members of the Center have been awarded research grants from both public, government, and private sources including the National Institutes of Health, the American Heart Association, the Environmental Protection Agency (EPA), the Department of Defense, and the Bill & Melinda Gates Foundation. The center has institutional collaborators including MIT, Emory University, and Harvard Medical School. Research interests of the Center include Advanced Imaging, Aging, ALS, Alzheimer's Disease and Dementia, Models of Injury and Disease, Blood Diseases, Brain Injury, Cancer, Cardiovascular Diseases, Diabetes, Drug Discovery, Environmental Health, Eye Diseases, Medical Robotics, Musculoskeletal Diseases, Nervous System diseases, Non-Invasive Imaging, Obesity, Parkinson's Disease, Stem Cell Therapy, Stroke, Tissue Regeneration and Repair, and Toxicology. One example of the results of Center research is a new drug that is the first neural stem cell therapy that targets brain inflammation of ischemic stroke patients that will enter clinical trials having been cleared by the Food and Drug Administration. In addition, the Center faculty educates national and international researchers, as well as graduate and undergraduate students.

=== Bioenergy Systems Research Institute ===
The Bioenergy Systems Research Institute conducts research in bioenergy that recognize the entire lifecycle and environmental impact of biomass production, harvesting, transport, treatment, conversion, and recycling. In 2013, the Institute received a $20 million from the United States Department of Energy (DOE) Office of Energy Efficiency and Renewable Energy (EERE) and the Golden Field Office (GFO). The institute was established to help bolster the university's research expenditure in environmental science.

The 2013 SEC Academic Symposium, an academic conference-type event intended to address a scholarly issue in an area of strength represented by all SEC universities, was organized and led by the University of Georgia and the UGA Bioenergy Systems Research Institute in Atlanta, Georgia. The topic of the Symposium was titled, the "Impact of the Southeast in the World's Renewable Energy Future."

=== Odum School of Ecology ===
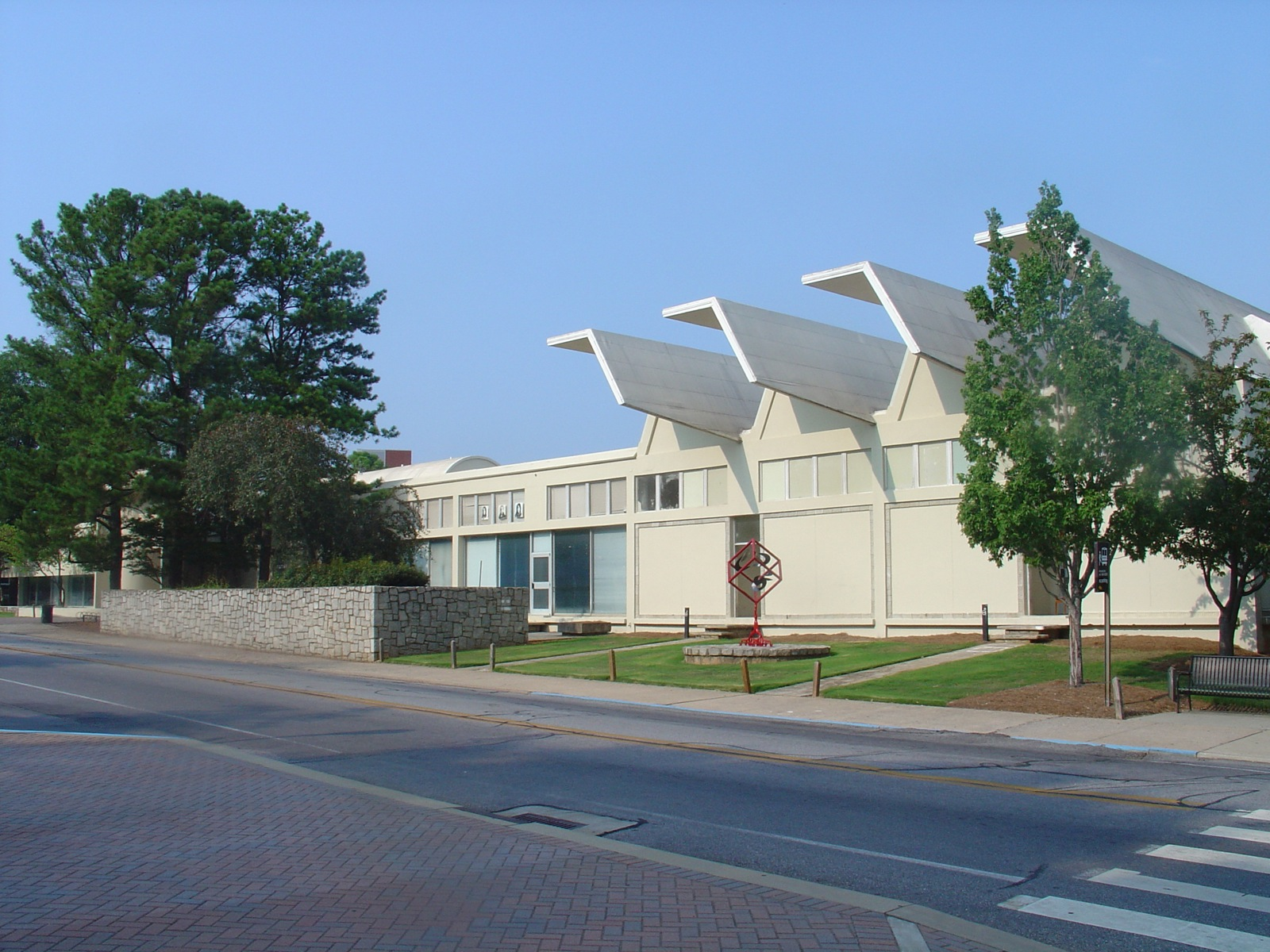
The College of Environment and Design building at the University of Georgia is a LEED certified structure that features 72 solar panels and water reclamation technology.

In 2007, the Odum School of Ecology became the first-stand alone college or school within a university dedicated to the study of ecology and environmental science. The school was named after UGA professor and ecologist, Eugene Odum, who pioneered the modern study of ecology.

The university has since made several advancements in sustainability. Under the UGA Facilities Management Division, the Office of Sustainability was initiated in 2010 as part of a strategic directive to enhance conservation of resources and long-term sustainability at the university. Through long-term environmental initiatives, under President Michael F. Adams the university established the office after support from students and faculty and residents of the Athens area. The Office of Sustainability's mission is to continue to improve environmental sustainability in many different areas on campus.

The initiative was a result of a 2009 Report of the Working Group on Sustainability at the University of Georgia and the Green Initiative Fund (TGIF) student-led campaign. The Green Initiative Fund modeled their funding campaign after a similar campaign by students at the University of California-Berkeley. As of 2016, the Office of Sustainability has awarded a total of $170,000 to fund 47 student-initiated sustainability projects at UGA The Campus Sustainability Grants Program has helped foster several student initiatives, including water bottle refilling stations in the Zell B. Miller Learning Center, "Dawgs Ditch the Dumpster" residence hall move-out donation program, Tanyard Creek Chew Crew prescribed grazing project for invasive plant removal and Material Reuse Program, which uses salvaged items to construct school and community gardens.

The university and Athens-Clarke County established a bicycle master plan to improve the mobility of students on campus while remaining environmentally consciousness.

In 2009 the University of Georgia earned LEED certification from the U.S. Green Building Council with high marks for the expansion of the Tate Student Center. The renovated Tate Student Center became the sixth building on a university campus in the state of Georgia to be certified at the gold level and the second to be so designated in Athens. In 2012, Building 1516, a university housing complex constructed in 2010, became the first LEED-certified housing complex at the University of Georgia.

In 2012, the College of Environmental Design's Visual Arts Building (now known as the Jackson Street Building) after a $9.9 million renovation became the first UGA building to incorporate a water reclamation system and the first to utilize solar harvesting technology through solar panels.

In 2013 the university hosted the inaugural SEC Symposium in Atlanta. The topic is the Southeast's impact on the future of renewable energy, and the participants are the 14 universities of the SEC, as supported by its new academic initiative, SECU.

In the same year, the university was named by the National Arbor Foundation as a designated Tree Campus USA for the third time in a row as a result of the university's continued commitment to maintaining and adding new foliage. The University of Georgia has more than 9,000 trees on campus, according to an ongoing tree-mapping project being conducted by the University Grounds Department. The number will continue to grow due to a partnership between Select Sustainable Tree Trust and UGA. In 2009, the Select Sustainable Tree Trust selected the university to receive a $1 million tree donation to "re-green" and impact the university campus with large-scale, sustainable shade trees.

In April 2019, UGA entered into a contract to add up to 20 new electric buses. The 20 buses were put into service on campus in February 2020. In December 2019, as the university was awarded $7.46 million under the Federal Transit Administration's Grants for Buses and Bus Facilities Program, it was announced that 13 additional electric buses would be added to the fleet, which would bring the total number of electric buses on campus to 33. The electric buses will account for a third of the total fleet in 2021, when UGA begins to phase out and decommission older diesel buses. In 2025, UGA received a $7.2 million federal grant to purchase eight additional electric buses, which were put into service at the start of the fall semester of 2025.

=== Small Satellite Research Laboratory ===
The University of Georgia Small Satellite Research Laboratory (SSRL) was founded in 2016 by students with the help of researchers, scientists, and faculty associated the Center for Geospatial Research. The SSRL is funded by the NASA USIP (Undergraduate Student Instrument Project) to build a Cube Satellite for Low Earth Orbit. The SSRL is also part of the Air Force Research Laboratory's (AFRL) University Nanosatellite Program (UNP). The SSRL is student-led and will be building UGA's first satellite, a Cubesat, which will be sent to the International Space Station for deployment in late 2018.

=== Center for Computational Quantum Chemistry (CCQC) ===
The Center for Computational Quantum Chemistry (CCQC) is a research center in the department of chemistry, founded in 1987 by Professor Henry Schaefer, who continues to work there. Research at the CCQC employs computational chemistry to elucidate and/or correlate many areas of chemical research.

=== Georgia Advanced Computing Resource Center ===
The Georgia Advanced Computing Resource Center (GACRC), jointly established by the Office of the Vice President for Research and the Office of the Vice President for Information Technology, provides high-performance computing resources to the university's research community through the Sapelo2 cluster, housed at the Boyd Data Center. In 2024, the university invested $2.4 million to add 26 GPU compute nodes to the cluster—including NVIDIA H100, A100, and L4 hardware—to support faculty research in artificial intelligence, data science, and bioinformatics. The GACRC is a member of the Coalition for Academic Scientific Computation (CASC).

== Student life ==
Undergraduate demographics as of Fall 2023
Race and ethnicity	Total
White	67%
Asian	13%
Hispanic	8%
Black	6%
Two or more races	4%
International student	1%
Unknown	1%
Economic diversity
Low-income (Note: The percentage of students who received an income-based federal Pell grant intended for low-income students.)	18%
Affluent (Note: The percentage of students who are a part of the American middle class at the bare minimum.)	82%

The University of Georgia has registered almost 800 student organizations, academic associations, honor societies, student government organizations, cultural groups, sport teams, religious groups, publications, social groups and fraternities, volunteer and community service programs, philanthropic groups, and others that are all run by both graduate and undergraduate students and are integral parts of student life. In 2015 (the latest year), UGA was recognized by the President's Higher Education Community Service Honor Roll by the Corporation for National and Community Service. The honor is the highest federal recognition a college or university can receive for its commitment to volunteering, service-learning and civic engagement. The latest designation marks the ninth consecutive year UGA was named on the honor roll.

=== Student housing ===
Housing at the university is managed by the Department of University Housing. Student on-campus housing is divided into several communities: Brumby, Russell, Creswell, Black-Diallo-Miller, Hill, Myers, Reed, and the East Campus Village.

Brumby, Creswell, and Russell halls are collectively known as the "freshman high-rises" due to their similarities in design and function. All three are located just off Baxter Street on West Campus. These are the biggest residence halls on campus and each house about 1,000 freshmen. The Hill community of residence halls consists of six building in West Campus near the freshman dorms. The community has a females-only residence (Hill Hall) and six coed residences: Boggs, Church, Lipscomb, Mell, and Oglethorpe Halls.

The Myers community consists of four buildings in a quad located on South Campus. They are the coed residence halls Myers, Rutherford, and Mary Lyndon, along with Soule Hall which is reserved for female students. The Reed community is made up of four coed residence halls in North and Central Campus: Morris, Payne, Reed, and Building 1516. The East Campus Village consists of the apartment-style coed residences: Busbee, McWhorter, Rooker, and Vandiver.

=== Greek life ===
The University of Georgia maintains one of the South's oldest Greek systems. The fraternities and sororities maintain homes both on and off campus. There are a number of secret societies that exist at the university, such as Palladia and Gridiron. The first Greek letter fraternity to charter at the university was Sigma Alpha Epsilon in 1865, and the first sorority was Phi Mu in 1921. In 2023, 24 percent of undergraduate men and 37 percent of undergraduate women were active members in a fraternity or sorority on campus. There are 20 sorority and 28 fraternity chapters.

=== Reserve Officer Training Corps ===
Under the Morrill Act, as a land-grant university, UGA is required to include a military program as part of its available curriculum, which program is now known as the Reserve Officer Training Corps (ROTC). Many universities that are not land-grant have established ROTC programs such as the one at Harvard University. The University of Georgia ROTC is the official officer training and commissioning program at the university. Prior to the 1862 Morrill Act, UGA founded its military program in 1801, and it is one of the oldest such programs in the nation. Memorial Hall was built with funds that Georgia alumni raised following World War I and was dedicated in 1924 to those alumni and students who had given their lives in the war. Departments of the Army and the Air Force each maintain an ROTC detachment on campus.

=== Student Government Association ===
Executives of the University of Georgia's Student Government Association (SGA) make up the Student Advisory Council, which is composed of Student Government Presidents from every public college or university within the University System of Georgia. The Student Advisory Council is organized to advise the Georgia Board of Regents, through the Chancellor, on issues that are important to students.

=== Student media ===
The Red & Black (R&B) is UGA's independent daily newspaper. Established in 1893 and independent of the university since 1980, The Red & Black is the largest college newspaper in Georgia and the tenth largest newspaper in the state of Georgia. Students published its first issue on November 24, 1893, from offices in the Academic Building on North Campus. The paper is self-sufficient through the sale of advertising making it one of the few student newspapers to do so. The Red & Black has won numerous awards nationally. In 2012, the Princeton Review named The Red & Black tenth among the nation's best student newspapers.

R&B-TV is the photos and videos division of The Red & Black. R&B-TV publishes various videos relating to the University of Georgia and the community at large.

WUOG is the radio station run by students of the University of Georgia. On October 16, 1972, WUOG signed on for its first day of broadcasting to Athens and the surrounding area. WUOG broadcasts with 26,000 watts.

Launched in 2011, Ampersand Magazine is a UGA monthly publication catered to Athens residents. The magazine is subsidized by The Red and Black.

Stethoscope Magazine (formerly, PreMed Magazine) is a “student-run publication at the University of Georgia dedicated to promoting science and providing relevant healthcare-related news.” It also has a website, as well as Linktree, Facebook, and Instagram accounts. The magazine further aims to help pre-medical and other pre-health students at the university achieve success in the medical field. Staffing for the magazine is open to students of all majors and concentrations. Topics range from student achievement in medicine and health science, to health science news, to recent innovations in biomedical sciences.

Georgia Political Review (GPR) is a student-run magazine and website focusing on political science, international affairs, history, and economics at the local, state, national, and international levels while providing timely commentary on politics and foreign affairs. In addition to its magazine and website, it publishes a weekly newsletter called GPR Digest, which offers short summaries of recent political and cultural events, every year hosts The Great Debate, a moderated debate among college political groups, and has X, Facebook, and Instagram accounts. It was founded in 2011 by 6 undergraduate students at UGA and is a student publication unique in the state university system.

Law students publish four legal journals: Georgia Law Review, the Journal of Intellectual Property Law, the Georgia Journal of International and Comparative Law, and the Georgia Criminal Law Review. In addition to the Georgia Law Review, students publish the online component, the Georgia Law Review Online, which features essays by practitioners, judges and professors focused primarily on timely legal issues in the U.S. Courts of Appeals.

Pandora is the yearbook of the University of Georgia; its first issue was published in 1886.

== Athletics ==
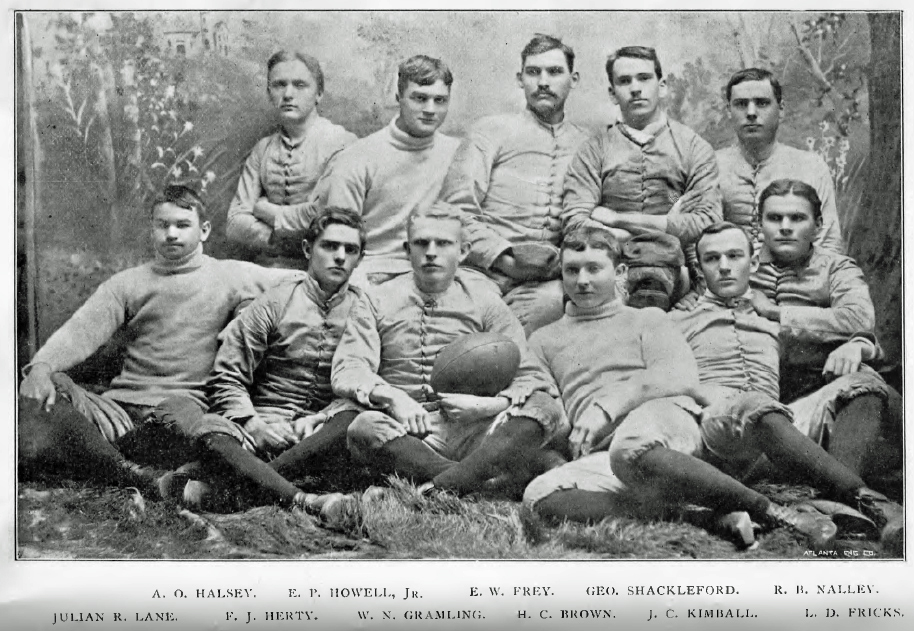
The first football squad at the University of Georgia in 1892.

The University of Georgia varsity athletic teams participate in the NCAA's Division I FBS as a member of the Southeastern Conference. Since the 1997–1998 season, UGA has seven top ten rankings in the National Association of Collegiate Directors of Athletics (NACDA) Directors' Cup, a numerical ranking based on the success of universities in all varsity sports. The university has won national championships in football, women's gymnastics, women's equestrian, baseball, tennis (men's and women's), golf (men's and women's), indoor and outdoor track & field, and women's swimming and diving. The Gym Dogs, the university's women's gymnastics team, have an NCAA-leading 10 national championships in gymnastics, including five consecutive championships from 2005 to 2009.

The Bulldogs' most historic rivalry is with the nearby Georgia Tech Yellow Jackets. However, major rivalries have grown since, including the rivalry with the Florida Gators, and with the Auburn Tigers, referred to as the "Deep South's Oldest Rivalry" in reference to the first football game played between the two teams in 1892 and the more than one hundred meetings since. In 2011, The Huffington Post named the Florida–Georgia football rivalry one of college football's top 10 rivalries.

The university also hosts several non-varsity sports, including wrestling, men's soccer, crew, ultimate frisbee, rugby, lacrosse, ice hockey, and sailing. Georgia's men's lacrosse team has won the South Eastern Lacrosse Conference three times, in 1998, 2007, and 2008, and received an automatic bid to the Men's Collegiate Lacrosse Association national tournament, while the women's team earned an at-large bid to the WDIA National Tournament in 2007.

=== 1996 Summer Olympic Games ===
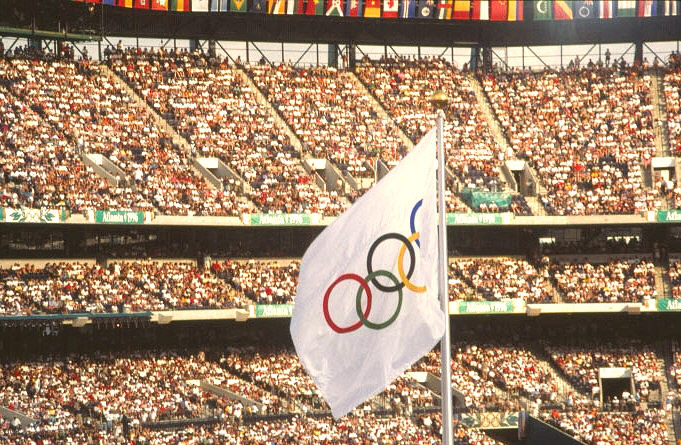
The Olympic flag waves at the 1996 games

The University of Georgia played an instrumental role in Atlanta's bid for the 1996 Summer Olympics. The University of Georgia conducted a majority of the preliminary studies for the economic impact of bringing the Olympic Games to Atlanta, and hosted many Olympic events. In 1987, Atlanta attorney and former football player at the University of Georgia, William "Billy" Payne, conceived the idea of hosting the 1996 Summer Olympic Games. Atlanta mayor Andrew Young was among the first to join Payne in the quest to develop a bid and sell the proposal, first to local business leaders, then to the U.S. Olympic Committee, and finally to the members of the International Olympic Committee (IOC). The home of the Bulldogs hosted the medal round of the men's and women's Olympic football (soccer) in July 1996. Sanford Stadium was temporarily converted into a soccer stadium which saw the removal of the privet hedges surrounding the playing field. The hedges had been symbolic to UGA since the early 1930s. The hedges were restored after the Olympic games. In 1996, UGA's High Point was selected as the training site for the U.S. Dressage Team, which competed in the Summer Olympic games at the International Horse Park in Conyers, Georgia. The university's basketball stadium, Stegeman Coliseum, was the venue for Volleyball and Rhythmic Gymnastics.

== Traditions ==
=== School colors ===
UGA athletics logo

The University of Georgia's original colors included old gold, until the intense rivalry between Georgia Tech and Georgia around 1891 resulted in a skirmish over colors. Georgia students and alumni declared yellow an unfit color for the Georgia Bulldogs, deeming it a cowardly color. After the 1893 football game against Georgia Tech, University of Georgia President, Charles Herty, removed old gold as an official school color. Crimson (also referred to as "Good Old Georgia Red") and black have been the official colors ever since.

The decision to include crimson red is also thought to be a tribute to the state of Georgia and a reminder of the university's flagship status. Kaolinite, commonly referred to as "Georgia red clay" is commonly found throughout the state, especially in the Red Hills Region. The red color that is so evident in Georgia soils is due primarily to iron oxides.

=== The mascot ===
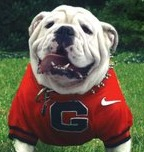
Uga VI, the official live mascot of the Georgia Bulldogs 1999–2008

Bulldogs have been on the sidelines for UGA athletic events since at least the 1800s. The origin of the English Bulldog representing UGA athletic teams came from Yale University, with whom UGA had strong ties in its early years. Many early buildings and campus plans followed the layout of Yale. The bulldog mascot stems from the university's founding father and first president, Abraham Baldwin, who was a graduate of Yale. The Bulldog mascots were thought to be a tribute to Baldwin's alma mater. The term "Georgia Bulldogs" to identify a Georgia team was first coined on November 3, 1920, by Atlanta Journal-Constitution writer Morgan Blake. After a 0–0 tie with the University of Virginia in Charlottesville on November 6, 1920, Atlanta Constitution writer Cliff Wheatley used the name "Bulldogs" in his story five times. This name for UGA teams caught on and has been used ever since.

Uga the Bulldog is the official live mascot of the Georgia Bulldogs. Uga is from a line owned by Frank W. (Sonny) Seiler of Savannah, Georgia since 1956. The current line began with Uga I, a solid white English Bulldog who was the grandson of a former Georgia mascot who made the trip to the 1943 Rose Bowl. Perhaps the most famous Uga was Uga V who made appearances in the movie Midnight in the Garden of Good and Evil. Uga V was also featured on the cover of the April 1997 edition of Sports Illustrated. Uga XI became the mascot in 2023.

The University of Georgia is the only major college that buries its mascots within the confines of its stadium. Ugas I, II, III, IV, V, VI, VII, VIII, and IX are buried in marble vaults near the main gate in the embankment of the south stands of Sanford Stadium. Epitaphs to the dogs are inscribed in bronze, and before each home game, flowers are placed on their graves.

=== The Chapel Bell ===
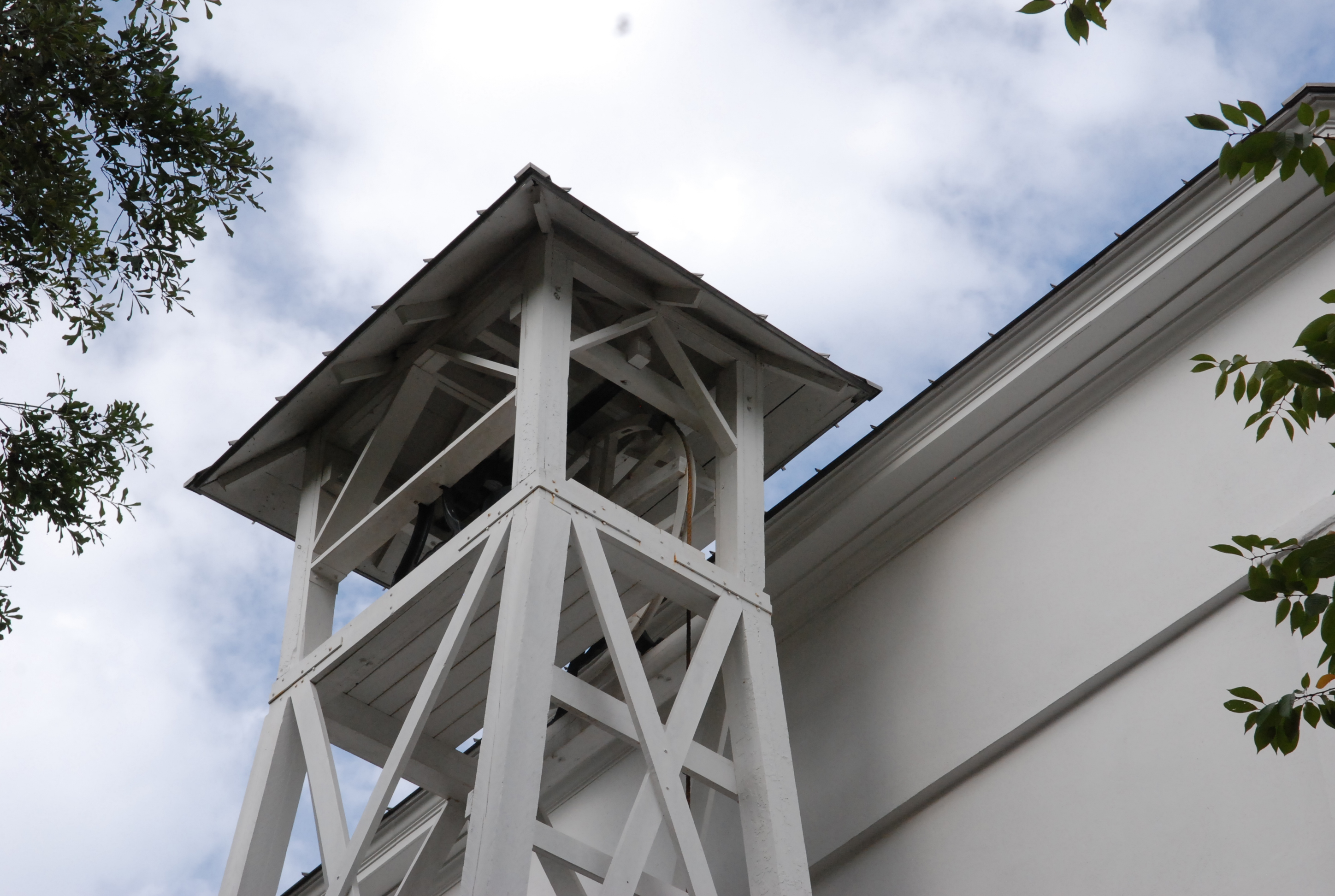
The ringing of the Chapel Bell is a tradition held by students and alumni of the University of Georgia

The Chapel Bell is a historic monument and long-standing tradition of the University of Georgia. The Chapel Bell is located on the historic North Campus. Built in 1832, when Protestant orthodoxy dominated the campus region, the chapel was a center of campus activities. A daily religious service, which students were required to attend, were held there, as were assemblies and commencements. The bell was also rung to mark the beginning and the end of class.

Over the years, the Chapel Bell has served as an athletic tradition at the University of Georgia. The ringing of the Chapel Bell after a Georgia victory is a tradition that has endured since the 1890s. In Georgia football's early days, Herty Field was located only yards from the chapel, and first-year students were compelled to ring the bell until midnight in celebration of a Bulldog victory. Today, students, alumni, fans and townspeople still rush to the chapel to ring the bell after a victory. The bell is also utilized for University meetings and events, weddings and remembrance ringing. The bell was rung in memory of victims of the September 11 attacks in 2001. After the 2012 Sandy Hook shooting, the University of Georgia partook in a nationwide mourning by ringing the Chapel Bell in honor of the victims of the shooting.

On October 27, 2007, as tradition warrants, Georgia fans rang the Chapel Bell to celebrate the 42–30 win over the university's archrival, the Florida Gators. The excitement caused the yoke holding the 877 lb. bell to give way, and it fell from the support platform. The university has returned the bell to its historic post and as of November 2017, it still rings daily across campus.

=== Founders Week ===
January 27, 1785, is the date the University of Georgia became the first public university to have a charter granted. Each year, January 27 is commemorated to honor UGA's place in the history of American colleges and universities. The tradition began in 2002 and is now celebrated as Founders Week. During Founders Week, a series of celebrations are hosted by various campus departments including the Student Alumni Association and the Student Government Association.

The Emeriti Scholars, a group of retired faculty members especially known for their teaching abilities and continued involvement in the university's academic life, sponsor the Founders Day Lecture. The lecture is held in the UGA Chapel and has become a Founders Day tradition, drawing alumni, students, faculty, esteemed guests and members of the community.

=== The Arch ===
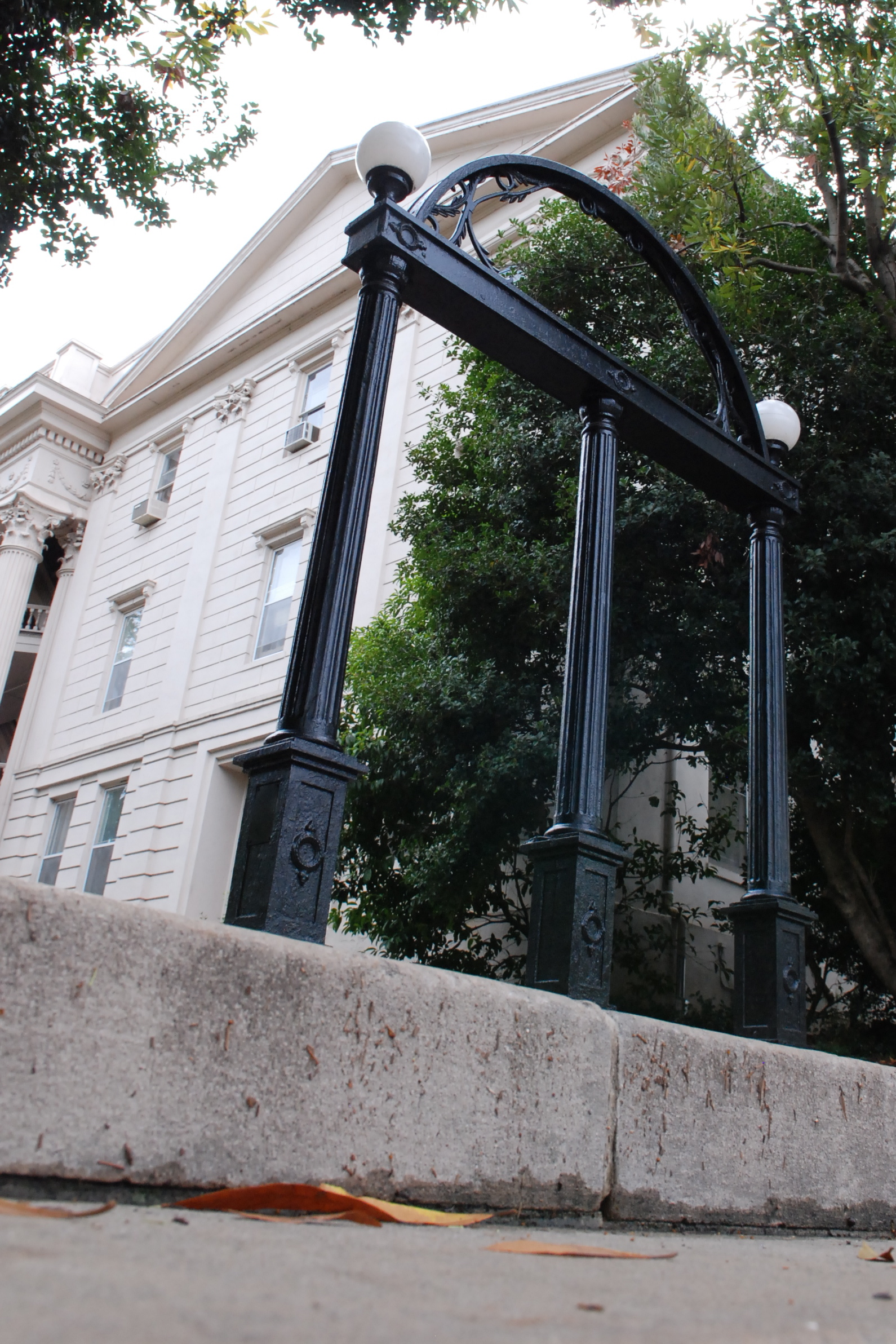
The Arch at the University of Georgia

In 1857, the University of Georgia constructed a cast iron representation of the architectural elements featured on the obverse of the Great Seal of the state of Georgia. It stands at the north entrance of the campus, and has become known as The Arch. Fashioned from existing material, The Arch is a representation but not an exact replica of the architectural elements of the Seal. Originally serving both symbolic and practical functions, it was connected to a barrier which kept cows from roaming over parts of the campus, and was initially known as The Gate. It serves as the official icon and a historic landmark for the university. Since the 1900s, tradition has held that students may not pass beneath the Arch until they have received a diploma from the University of Georgia. Those who walked under the Arch prior to graduation commencement were said never to graduate. The tradition began when Daniel Huntley Redfearn, Class of 1910, arrived as a freshman from Boston, Georgia and vowed not to pass beneath the Arch until he had graduated. One of Redfearn's professors heard the vow and repeated it to his class, and the tradition has stood ever since. Many freshmen, learning of the tradition during orientation or from other sources still choose to honor the century-old tradition. Years of following the tradition are visible on the concrete steps leading to the Arch. Steps to each side have been worn down over the years as undergraduates have kept their vows.

The Arch has been a site of historic political demonstrations. In 1961, when UGA officials desegregated the university with the admission of its first two African-American students, Hamilton Holmes and Charlayne Hunter-Gault, The Arch was a witness to students protesting both for and against segregation. It has also seen protesting of the Persian Gulf War and a demonstration following the 1970 shootings at Kent State University. In 2001, along with the Chapel Bell, the Arch was the site of a memorial to the victims of the September 11 attacks.

=== The fight song and "Alma Mater" ===
"Glory, Glory" is the rally song for the Georgia Bulldogs. "Glory, Glory" is sung to the tune of "The Battle Hymn of the Republic". It was sung at games as early as the 1890s, but arranged in its present form by musician-composer Hugh Hodgson in 1915. There have been many Bulldog songs through the years and at least two collections dating back to 1909 have been published, but "Glory, Glory" has been the most accepted among students and alumni. The only known original reference to the piece is in a history of the Redcoat Band written in 1962, which briefly mentions the march as "Georgia's first original school song" and notes that "all copies of the work have been lost." The document is kept in the university's Hargrett Library for rare and historic documents.

Although "Glory, Glory" is generally thought to be the school's fight song, the official fight song is "Hail to Georgia." Both are performed at football games by the Georgia Redcoat Marching Band, which plays the fight song after field goals and extra points, and "Glory, Glory" after touchdowns, interceptions, and victories. First stablished in 1905 as a military band, the Redcoat Band now has over 430 members and represents the university in sporting and community events.

The "Alma Mater", the official school song of the University of Georgia, is set to the tune of "Annie Lisle", a popular 1857 ballad by H. S. Thompson. The lyrics to "Alma Mater", penned by J.B. Wright Jr., and Gail Carter Dendy, are unique to UGA. The song is sung at commencement and various official events of the University of Georgia.

=== Playing "Between the Hedges" and Sanford Stadium ===
Sanford Stadium is the on-campus playing venue for football at the University of Georgia in Athens. The 92,746-seat stadium is the seventh largest stadium in the National Collegiate Athletic Association and has a grass (versus synthetic) field. The stadium is the eighth largest non-racing stadium in the United States and the 14th largest such stadium in the world. The stadium played host to the Olympic medal competition of men's and women's Olympic football (soccer) at the 1996 Summer Olympics.

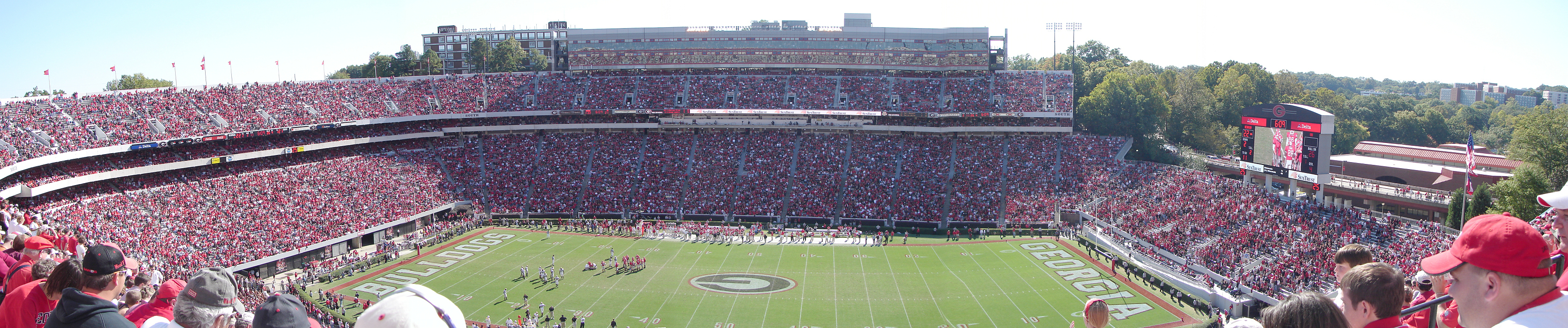
A panoramic view from Sanford's upper North Deck during the October 14, 2006 home game against the Vanderbilt Commodores (picture does not show newly constructed additions from 2009 to Tate Student Center)

The University of Georgia playing "Between the Hedges" is a reference to Sanford Stadium that dates back to the early 1930s. The famous Chinese privet hedges that surround Sanford's playing field were only one foot high when the stadium was dedicated in 1929 and were protected by a wooden fence. Sports writers, referring to an upcoming home game, were said to observe "that the Bulldogs will have their opponent "between the hedges." The phrase was coined by the Atlanta sportswriter Grantland Rice. Games played there are said to be played "Between the Hedges" due to the privet hedges, which had stood around the field since 1929, but removed in the summer of 1996 so that soccer could be played for the 1996 Summer Olympics; new, albeit considerably shorter, hedges were restored in the fall of 1996. The hedges have been dubbed Hedges II by UGA fans.

=== The Dawg Walk ===
The Dawg Walk is a Saturday football tradition and celebration at University of Georgia home games when UGA students and fans line up in the Tate Center parking lot to form a tunnel that greets the players and coaches as they enter Sanford Stadium. The team enters the stadium through Gate 10 at Sanford Stadium to the music of the Redcoat Marching Band. The march is often led by the team's costumed mascot Hairy Dawg.

The Dawg Walk is preceded by two show section shows. The Redcoat Sousaphones perform a warm up concert in the Tate Center assembly area, while the Redcoat Drumline performs a drumshow in the parking lot.

== Notable alumni ==
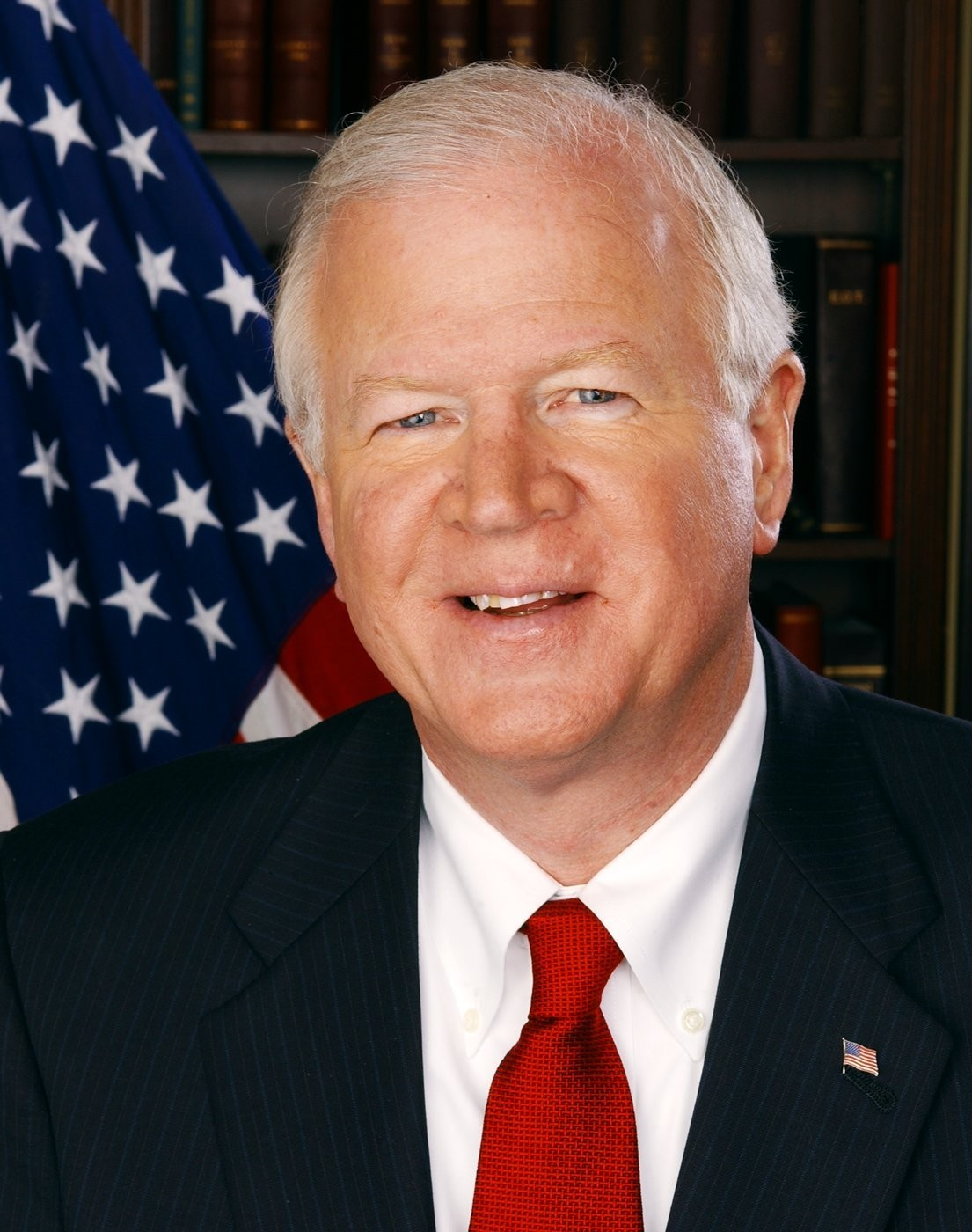
Former U.S. Senator Saxby Chambliss

University graduates include over 110 state and federal legislators, 70 federal judges, and numerous state supreme court justices, government officials, and ambassadors. Notable alumni include former acting United States Attorney General Sally Yates, Ertharin Cousin who was named to the TIME 100 most influential people in the world list, John Archibald Campbell, a U.S. Supreme Court justice, and President Pro Tempore of the U.S. Senate Richard B. Russell Jr. Twenty-five University of Georgia alumni have become state governors, including six of the last seven governors of Georgia: George Busbee, Joe Frank Harris, Zell Miller, Roy Barnes, Sonny Perdue, and Brian Kemp. Miller also served as United States Senator as did several other UGA alumni, including Johnny Isakson, and Saxby Chambliss. Examples of some other alumni who served in high levels of government included Abdul Karim al-Iryani, the former prime minister of Yemen; Lloyd D. Brown, an Army major general who commanded the 28th Infantry Division in World War II; William Tapley Bennett Jr., a U.S. ambassador to the Dominican Republic, Portugal, NATO, and the United Nations Security Council; Randy Evans, the former U.S. ambassador to Luxembourg; Eugene E. Habiger, an Air Force four-star general who served as commander-in-chief of the United States Strategic Command from 1996 to 1998; Chee Soon Juan, a neuropsychologist, research fellow at universities including the University of Chicago, politician, and leader of the Singapore Democratic Party; and Phil Gramm, an economist and U.S. senator from Texas.

University of Georgia alumni who pursued a career in investing and banking include Eugene R. Black Sr., the president of the World Bank from 1949 to 1963; Eugene Robert Black, chairman of the Federal Reserve; economist Robert D. McTeer, president of the Federal Reserve Bank of Dallas; and Brown L. Whatley, chairman of Arvida Corp. and president of the Mortgage Bankers Association. Examples of others in the business world include Bernard Ramsey, an executive with the brokerage firm Merrill Lynch, Daniel P. Amos, the chairman and CEO of Aflac, M. Michele Burns, board member of Wal-Mart, Cisco Systems and Goldman Sachs, D.W. Brooks, founder and chairman of Gold Kist, A.D. "Pete" Correll, chairman of Georgia-Pacific and director of SunTrust Bank, Mirant and Norfolk Southern, Douglas Ivester, chairman and CEO of The Coca-Cola Company, board member of Truist Financial, honored with the Edison Achievement Award and the Horatio Alger Award, and philanthropist, and Tom Cousins, a real estate developer, sports patron, and philanthropist. Cousins is the owner of the Atlanta Hawks.

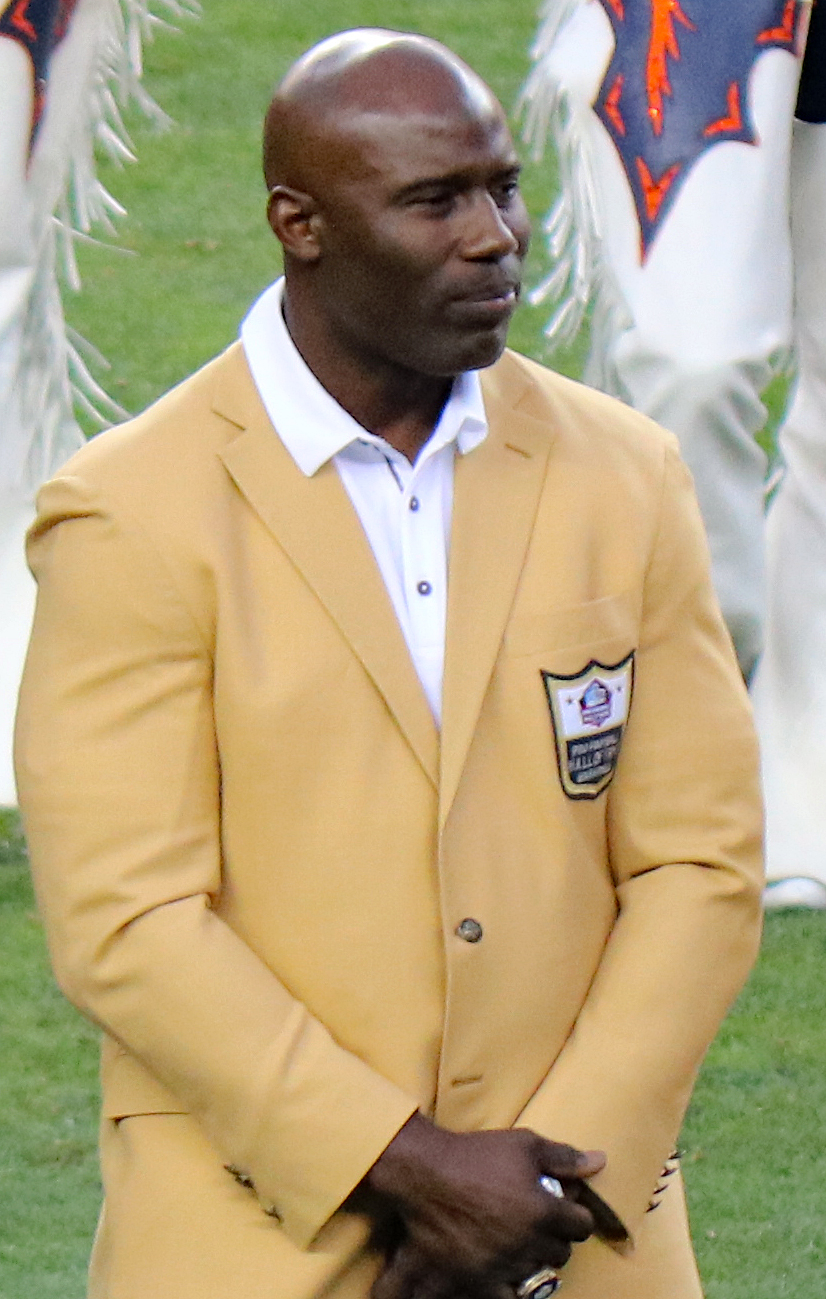
Terrell Davis, Pro Football Hall of Famer

William Porter Payne, who played football at UGA and was Vice Chairman of Bank of America became president and chief executive officer of the Atlanta Committee for the Olympic Games and later chairman of Augusta National Golf Club. Payne was largely responsible for bringing the 1996 Summer Olympics to Atlanta and the University of Georgia. In sports, particularly in the NFL, notable UGA alumni include Mike Macdonald, the Seattle Seahawks head coach, who was the youngest head coach in the NFL, and Terrell Davis, a two-time Super Bowl champion with the Denver Broncos who was inducted into the Pro Football Hall of Fame. Other Bulldogs that went on to a professional career include Hines Ward, a wide receiver who played the Pittsburgh Steelers for 15 seasons, Champ Bailey, a consensus All-American drafted by the Washington Redskins in the first round of the 1999 draft, and Reggie Brown, drafted by the Philadelphia Eagles in the second round of the 2005 draft. Alumni with careers in professional sports include Mitchell Boggs, a former baseball pitcher for the St. Louis Cardinals, and Kentavious Caldwell-Pope, a professional basketball player for the Los Angeles Lakers.

UGA alumni who have served in the scientific and medical fields include Alfred Blalock, a chief of surgery, professor, and director of the department of surgery of Johns Hopkins School of Medicine who ushered in the modern era of cardiac surgery; Cornelia Bargmann, a neurobiologist, who is Wiesel Professor of Genetics and Neurosciences at the Rockefeller University, investigator at Howard Hughes Medical Institute, and president of science at the Chan Zuckerberg Initiative; Crawford Long, a surgeon and pharmacist best known for the first use of inhaled diethyl ether as an anesthetic; Sir David Baulcombe, FRS, a geneticist who is professor of Botany at the University of Cambridge; Hervey M. Cleckley, a psychiatrist and pioneer in the field of psychopathy whose published work was the most influential clinical description of psychopathy in the twentieth century and who was co-author of The Three Faces of Eve; Barbara Rothbaum, a psychologist, medical school professor, and pioneer in the treatment of anxiety-related disorders who has played a key role in the development of the treatment of posttraumatic stress disorder (PTSD); Eugene T. Booth, a nuclear physicist who was a member of the historic team that made the first demonstration of nuclear fission in the United States; A. Jamie Cuticchia, a bioinformatics pioneer with expertise in the fields of genetics, bioinformatics, and genomics who was responsible for the groundbreaking collection of data constituting the human gene map and who is director of human genome database; James E. Boyd, a physicist, mathematician, and founder of Scientific Atlanta, part of Cisco; and Beth Shapiro, MacArthur Fellow and National Academy of Sciences evolutionary molecular biologist and Howard Hughes Medical Institute investigator.

UGA alumni have made significant contributions to the field of journalism and media. They include Henry W. Grady, a journalist and orator from the late 19th-century after whom the College of Journalism was named, and Clark Howell, a Pulitzer Prize-winning reporter who became the namesake of one of the buildings at his alma mater. Howell succeeded Grady as managing editor of the Atlanta Constitution. More recent journalism alumni include Charlayne Hunter-Gault, a multiple Emmy Award and Peabody Award winning former reporter for The New York Times, PBS NewsHour and CNN, Deborah Blum, Pulitzer Prize-winning author, journalist, science writer and professor at Massachusetts Institute of Technology; John Holliman, a broadcast journalist with CNN, known for his coverage of space exploration and reporting during the Persian Gulf War (and to whom NASA dedicated its Launch Complex 39 Press Site facility at the Kennedy Space Center); Mary Katharine Ham, a journalist, political commentator, and guest host of The View; as well as a CNN and Fox News Channel contributor, Pat Mitchell, media industry CEO, producer, professor, and author who worked at NBC (where she was the first woman to produce and host a national program) and other news broadcasters, and who has taught at Harvard University's John F. Kennedy School of Government and other universities; Alice Stewart, political commentator for CNN, Emmy Award winner, communications director for presidential campaigns, and a Harvard Fellow at the John F. Kennedy School of Government; Mark B. Perry, a television producer, television writer and Primetime Emmy Award winner; Deborah Norville, an anchor for Inside Edition; and the ABC News television presenters Deborah Roberts and Amy Robach. Both Roberts and Robach appear on 20/20 and Good Morning America.

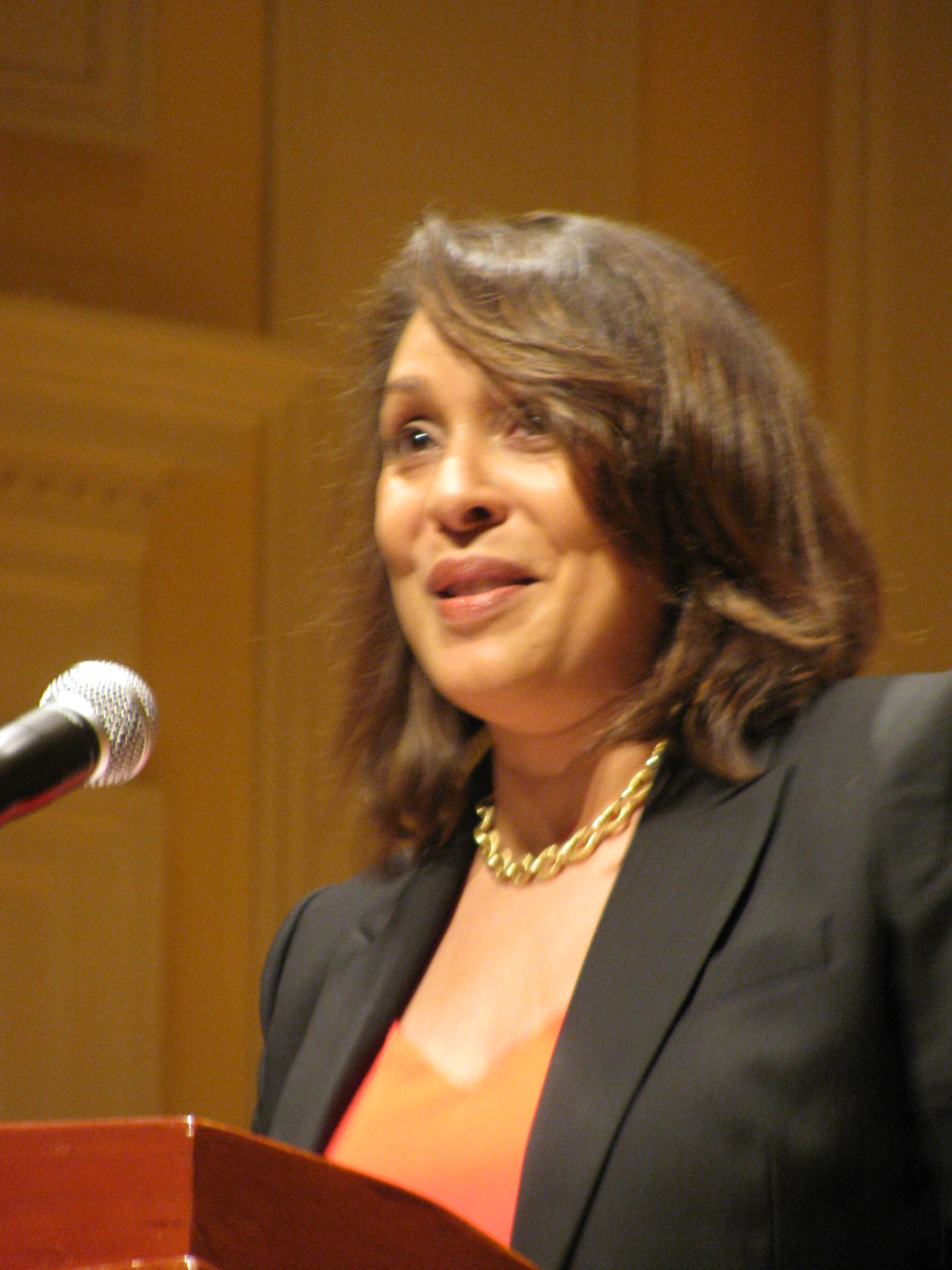
Natasha Tretheway, United States Poet Laureate

A total of nine UGA graduates have received the Pulitzer Prize, including Natasha Tretheway, winner of the 2007 Pulitzer Prize in Poetry, who was appointed United States Poet Laureate in 2012 and again in 2014. Other notable UGA alumni in print media include Tom Johnson, a former publisher of the Los Angeles Times; Sherrilyn Kenyon, author of over 100 novels; and Stuart Woods, a prolific novelist with more than 60 books.

Former UGA students in the music industry include Danger Mouse, Dave Haywood and Charles Kelley of Lady Antebellum, and several members of the bands the B-52's, R.E.M. and Widespread Panic. After studying film at the university, Alton Brown became the director of photography on the music video for R.E.M.'s "The One I Love". Brown went on to create the Food Network television show Good Eats. Examples of some other notable alumni in film, television, and radio include Kim Basinger, an actress winning the BAFTA Award, Golden Globe Award, Screen Actors Guild Award, and the Academy Award for Best Supporting Actress, as well as Sonny Shroyer, Fred Newman, Matt Lanter, Kyle Chandler, IronE Singleton, Wayne Knight, Tituss Burgess, Parvati Shallow, and Ryan Seacrest.

== See also ==
- President's House
- Center for Computational Quantum Chemistry (CCQC)
- List of colleges and universities in metropolitan Atlanta
