= Lisa Rossbacher =

American earth scientist

Lisa A. Rossbacher

7th President of Humboldt State University
- In office July 2014 – June 2019
- Preceded by: Dr. Rollin C. Richmond
- Succeeded by: Tom Jackson Jr.

2nd President of Southern Polytechnic State University
- In office 1998 – March 2014
- Preceded by: Daniel S. Papp (interim)
- Succeeded by: Ron Kroger (interim)

Personal details
- Born: Fredericksburg, VA, U.S.
- Spouse: Dallas D. Rhodes
- Education: Dickinson College (BS), SUNY (MA), Princeton University (MS, PhD)
- Profession: Scientist, writer, Academic Administrator
- Scientific career
- Fields: Geology; Planetary science
- Workplaces: NASA; California State Polytechnic University, Pomona; Whittier College; Dickinson College; Southern Polytechnic State University; Humboldt State University
- Thesis: Geomorphic studies of Mars (1983)
- Doctoral advisor: Robert B. Hargraves

Lisa A. Rossbacher is an American scientist, writer and academic administrator.

She is the president emerita of Southern Polytechnic State University. She has also held the posts of President of Cal Poly Humboldt, Vice Chancellor of the University System of Georgia and Chair of Metro Atlanta’s Cobb Chamber of Commerce.

Rossbacher is also a geologist, writer, professor, former Vice Chancellor of the University System of Georgia, community leader, she is also a past Chair of Metro Atlanta's Cobb Chamber of Commerce, an author of several books on geology and a Geotimes Magazine columnist.

== Personal life and education ==
Rossbacher was born in Fredericksburg, VA in 1953, as the eldest of three children. She resided in Dahlgren, Virginia during her childhood where her father was employed by the U.S. Defense Department, and performed research for the then Naval Weapons Lab.

She studied at Dickinson College, where she earned a Bachelor of Science in Geology. She attended graduate school at the State University of New York at Binghamton and received a Master of Arts in Geological Sciences. She went on to complete her academic studies at Princeton University, receiving both a M.A. and PhD in Geological and Geophysical Science in 1983.

Rossbacher is married to Dallas D. Rhodes, the former Department Chair of Geology and Geography at Georgia Southern University.

== Career ==
Throughout her academic studies Rossbacher worked for various government and non-profit institutions. She performed research for NASA as an astronaut candidate, and provided services for National Public Radio, and the U.S. Geological Survey.

From 1984 to 1993 she held several posts at California State Polytechnic University, Pomona, including being the associate vice president for academic affairs. She then moved to Whittier College, where she was vice-president for academic affairs for 2 years. Rossbacher then returned to Dickinson College and was dean of faculty for 3 years. In 1998 she relocated to Southern Polytechnic State University and was their president for 16 years. In 2014 she moved to the Cal Poly Humboldt, where she was president for 5 years until her retirement.

== President of Southern Polytechnic State University ==
In 1998, the board of regents of the University System of Georgia appointed Rossbacher as the second president of Southern Polytechnic State University. As president of SPSU, she was the chief officer and spokesperson of the second largest engineering technology university in the nation. SPSU was founded in 1948 as a two-year division of Georgia Tech, and was organized as an independent university in the early 1980s.

Rossbacher focused on environmental sustainability by gearing the university's campus towards a greener environment. In 2007 she partnered the university with the American College and university presidents' Climate Commitment, sponsored by the Association for the Advancement of Sustainability in Higher Education. In 2008 the university broke ground on a new Engineering Technology Center; Rossbacher's commitment to sustainability influenced the construction plans, enabling the design to meet the certification requirements of the Leadership in Energy and Environmental Design Green Building Rating System.

Rossbacher is also credited with increasing enrollment and retention by an average of 20% each, adding eight new degrees, and commissioning five new buildings on campus.

=== 9/11 Controversy ===
During the September 11 attacks the SPSU campus never closed and no classes were cancelled. On the morning of the attacks Rossbacher contacted campus police "around eleven-ish" after the second tower collapsed. No campus bulletins were issued. Dr. Rossbacher and University Police Captain George Scott later argued that there was no threat to the SPSU, despite the fact that the campus is located next to Dobbins Air Reserve Base.

== Works ==
As a scientist for NASA, she focused her research interests on the role of water and water ice on Mars.

=== Books ===
- Career Opportunities in Geology and the Earth Sciences
- Recent Revolutions in Geology
- Geomedia: A Guide for Geoscientists who meet the Press (with Rex Buchanan)
- Physical Geology: the Lab Manual (with geology faculty members at Princeton University and Whittier College)
- The Lab Book: Problem Solving in Geology (2nd Edition) Lisa A. Rossbacher et al

== Awards and honors ==
- Woman of the Year (2007), Cobb County Branch of the American Association of University Women
- Trailblazer Award (2015), California State University presidents, honoring women in academia

== See also ==
- Georgia Board of Regents
- Southern Polytechnic State University
- University System of Georgia
- Student Advisory Council of Georgia
