= WGHR =

WGHR may refer to two radio stations in the United States:

- WGHR (FM) 106.3, a commercial station licensed to serve Spring Hill, Florida, using the callsign since 2014
- WGHR (Georgia), an FM station in Marietta, Georgia (1981–2001) and via Internet continuously since then
