= Franklin College of Arts and Sciences =

College in Georgia, United States

Coordinates: 33°57′20.9″N 83°22′28.1″W

- Type: Public
- Established: 1801
- Dean: Anna W. Stenport
- Students: 15,501
- Undergraduates: 13,714
- Postgraduates: 1,787
- Location: Athens, Georgia, United States
- Website: www.franklin.uga.edu

The Franklin College of Arts and Sciences is the oldest and largest college of the University of Georgia (UGA) in Athens, Georgia. Established in 1801 following the American Revolution, the college was named in honor of American Founding Father Benjamin Franklin. Today, Franklin College comprises 30 departments in five divisions: fine arts, social sciences, biological sciences, physical and mathematical sciences, and the humanities.

From its founding Franklin College was the sole college of the University of Georgia, and the names of the two institutions were often used interchangeably to describe the fledgling university until 1859, when the university's colleges and schools were confederated starting with the establishment of the College of Law.

Franklin College has produced distinguished alumni from a wide array of fields, including Time Inc. editor-in-chief John Huey, Pulitzer Prize-winning poet Natasha Trethewey, R.E.M lead vocalist Michael Stipe, chef and television host Alton Brown, actor Wayne Knight and former Georgia Governor Roy Barnes.

== History ==
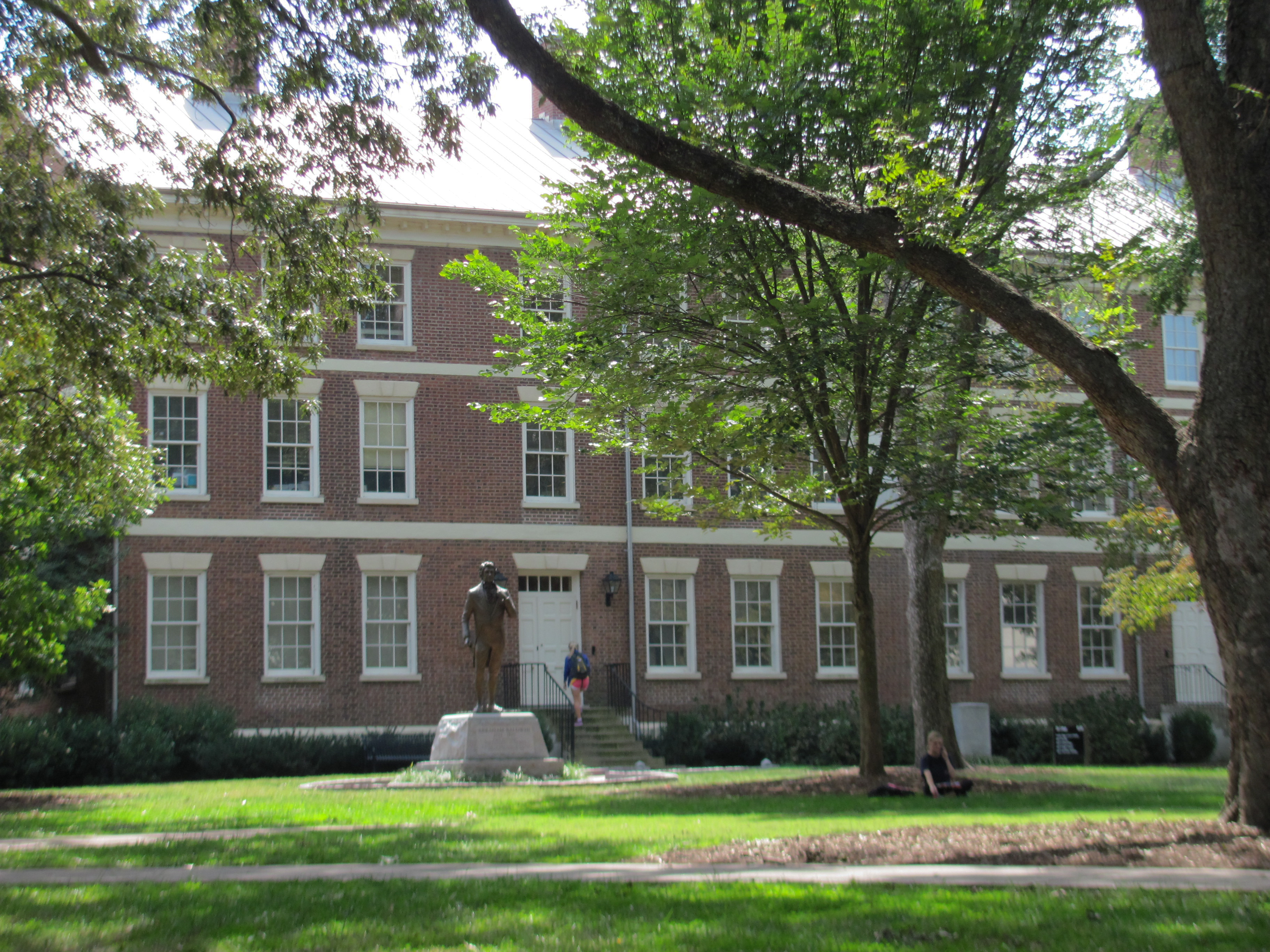
Old College located on the historic North Campus at the University of Georgia.

Franklin College first opened in 1801 and remained the sole college until 1859, when the Board of Trustees reorganized the university and created three additional colleges specifically focused on Law, Applied Mathematics, Civil Engineering, and Agriculture.

From that point it was known as the Franklin College of Liberal Arts, then later as Franklin College of Arts and Sciences as the university expanded over the years.

Initially, classes were taught under the shade of a large oak tree on what is present-day North Campus. The first permanent building on campus was a Georgian style three-story brick structure completed in 1806 and named Franklin College in honor of Benjamin Franklin. The University of Georgia would often be referred to as Franklin College for the next 50 years. Now known as Old College, it is the oldest building on the campus and has been used for many purposes over the years, including as a dormitory and boarding house space, classrooms, fortification and a safe harbor for the U.S. Navy. It now houses the offices for the Dean of Franklin College.

Old College is believed to have been patterned after Connecticut Hall at Yale University. Like other founders of the university, Abraham Baldwin, the university's first president, was a Yale alumnus, as was Josiah Meigs, who served as the university's second president. Entrance requirements to Franklin College were patterned after Yale with attention paid to proficiency in Latin and Greek. The college's classical curriculum also duplicated Yale's with its emphasis on Latin, Greek, Hebrew, mathematics, and philosophy.

Modeled after residential colleges found at some Ivy League universities, Franklin Residential College (FRC) is a residential community in Rutherford Hall housing select Franklin College undergraduates and a staff family who regularly host students in their home for intellectual, social, and cultural events.

== Academic divisions ==
Franklin College is organized into five academic divisions comprising 30 departments.

=== Biological Sciences ===
- Biochemistry and Molecular Biology
- Cellular Biology
- Genetics
- Marine Sciences
- Microbiology
- Plant Biology

=== Fine Arts ===
- Lamar Dodd School of Art
- Dance
- Hugh Hodgson School of Music
- Theatre and Film Studies

=== Humanities ===
- Classics
- Comparative Literature and Intercultural Studies
- English
- Germanic and Slavic Studies
- History
- Linguistics
- Philosophy
- Religion
- Romance Languages

=== Physical and Mathematical Sciences ===
- Chemistry
- School of Computing
- Geology
- Mathematics
- Physics and Astronomy
- Statistics

=== Social Sciences ===
- Anthropology
- Communication Studies
- Geography
- Psychology
- Sociology

== Accolades and honors ==
Franklin College is home to 49 fellows of the American Association for the Advancement of Science, four fellows of the American Academy of Arts and Sciences, fifteen Fulbright Scholars, a Grammy Award winner, three Guggenheim Fellows, four members of the National Academy of Sciences, seventeen National Science Foundation CAREER award recipients, two Presidential Early Career Award for Scientists and Engineers recipients, and nine Regents’ Professors.

All six of the University of Georgia's Marshall Scholarship recipients were Franklin College students.

== Deans ==
- David Crenshaw Barrow Jr., 1899-1906
- Charles Mercer Snelling, 1906-1925
- Steadman Vincent Sanford, 1925-1932
- L. L. Hendren, 1932-1946
- Leon P. Smith, 1946-1949
- S. Walter Martin, 1949-1957
- John O. Eidson, 1957-1968
- H. Boyd McWhorter, 1968-1972
- Victor S. Mamatey (acting), 1972-1973
- John C. Stephens, 1973-1977
- William J. (Jack) Payne, 1977–1988
- John J. Kozak, 1988-1992
- Wyatt Anderson, 1992–2004
- Garnett S. Stokes, 2004–2011
- Hugh Ruppersburg (interim), 2011–2012
- Alan T. Dorsey, 2012–2023
- Anna Westerstahl Stenport, 2023 – present
