= Southern Polytechnic State University =

Former state university in Marietta, Georgia, US

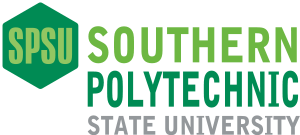
- Former names: The Technical Institute (1948–1949), Southern Technical Institute (1949–1987), Southern College of Technology (1987–1996)
- Motto: Imagination, Innovation, Application
- Type: Public
- Active: 1948–2015
- Founder: Blake R. Van Leer
- Affiliations: University System of Georgia
- Endowment: US$3.1 million (2012)
- Faculty: 226 full-time (fall 2013); 96 part-time (Fall 2013)
- Students: 6,238 (spring 2014)
- Undergraduates: 5,410 (spring 2014)
- Postgraduates: 802 (spring 2014)
- Other students: 26 (spring 2014)
- Location: Marietta, Georgia, U.S. 33°56′32″N 84°31′15″W
- Campus: Suburban (230+ acres)
- Colors: Green and White
- Nickname: Runnin' Hornets
- Sporting affiliations: Southern States Athletic Conference
- Mascot: Sting
- Website: spsu.edu

Southern Polytechnic State University (also called Southern Poly; abbreviated SPSU) was a public, co-educational, state university in Marietta, Georgia, United States approximately 20 miles (32 km) northwest of downtown Atlanta. Until 2015, it was an independent part of the University System of Georgia and called itself "Georgia's Technology University."

Southern Tech was founded in 1948 as The Technical Institute in Chamblee, Georgia by Blake R. Van Leer. The first classes were held with 116 students. It was renamed the Southern Technical Institute in 1949 and moved to its present campus in Marietta, Georgia in 1962. It went through another name change in 1987 and became the Southern College of Technology. In the summer of 1996, the university adopted its polytechnic name. It was one among a small group of polytechnic universities in the United States that tend to be primarily devoted to the instruction of technical arts and applied sciences.

On November 1, 2013, plans were announced by the Georgia Board of Regents for Southern Polytechnic and Kennesaw State University to be consolidated into one university. On January 6, 2015, the Georgia Board of Regents of the University System of Georgia approved the consolidation of Southern Poly and Kennesaw State, with Kennesaw State as the surviving institution. On July 1, 2015, Kennesaw State established the Southern Polytechnic College of Engineering and Engineering Technology in honor of the former SPSU.

== History ==
=== Establishment ===
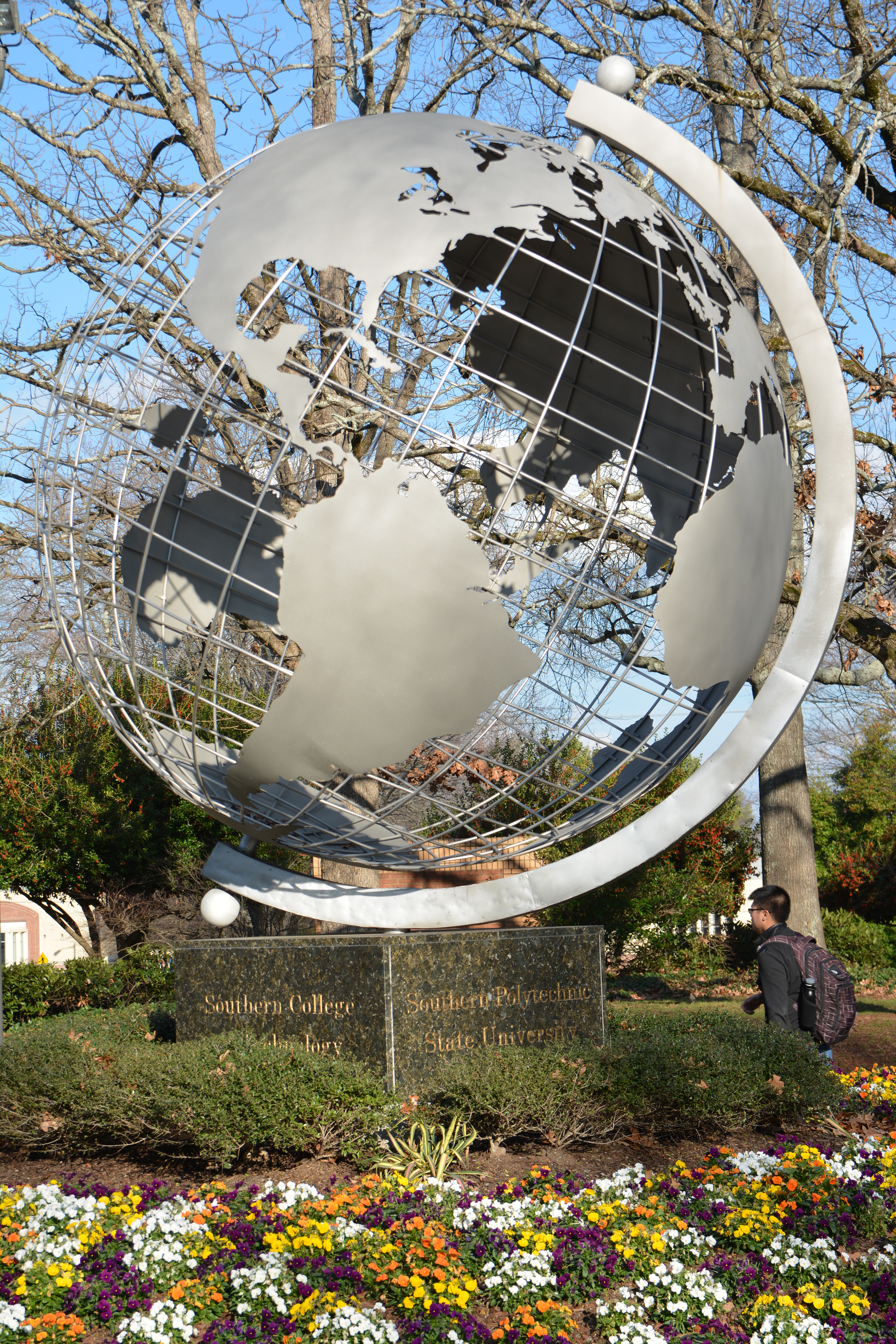
Globe

After World War II, the need for technicians spiked due to a major economic shift in Georgia from being a largely agricultural state to one that is more industry heavy. The new industries required technicians to bridge the growing gap between engineers and craftsmen, effectively the gap between research/development and building/implementing. At the time, most technical institutes in the United States were in the northeastern states; thus the need for a technical institute in the south was great.

In response to the growing demand, the president of the Georgia Institute of Technology, Colonel Blake R. Van Leer, sought to establish a technical institute program in Georgia. In 1945 he was approached by the Associated Industries of Georgia (AIG) who shared their common desire to have such a program and offered Van Leer their support. It took years for Van Leer to convince the Board of Regents to give Georgia Tech authorization to establish a technical institute. On October 8, 1947, the authorization was granted. The location chosen for the fledgling institute was a Naval Air Station in Chamblee, GA, which eventually became the site of DeKalb–Peachtree Airport. The first director was to be Professor Lawrence V. Johnson, and it was going to open under the name of The Technical Institute. On March 24, 1948, The Technical Institute held registration for the spring quarter and 116 students enrolled (all but 10 World War II veterans), including one young woman named Barbara Hudson. The institute had a staff of 12.

=== Progression ===
In 1949, The Technical Institute became the Southern Technical Institute and was recognized as a college-level school by the U.S. Department of Education. Twelve years later, the college migrated to its present campus in Marietta, Georgia, which was previously part of Dobbins Air Reserve Base. The General Lucius D. Clay National Guard Center (then known as Naval Air Station Atlanta) also moved to the opposite (south) end of Dobbins Air Reserve Base around the same time. In 1961, Hoyt McClure was named acting director and led the movement to build eight new buildings on 120 acres (49 ha) of land.

The Southern Technical Institute became accredited as a four-year college in 1970 and was one of the first colleges in the nation to offer the Bachelor of Engineering Technology degree. It also earned independence in the University System of Georgia, separating ties with Georgia Tech. In the summer of 1980, the college officially became the fourteenth senior college and the thirty-third independent unit of the University System of Georgia. The college's first president, Dr. Stephen R. Cheshier of Purdue University, was named in that same year. He saw the college through two name changes — Southern College of Technology (often called Southern Tech) in 1987 and Southern Polytechnic State University in the summer of 1996, when the school became a university. Dr. Cheshier retired as president of the university in June 1997. Dr. Daniel S. Papp served as interim president from July 1997 to August 1998, when the university welcomed Dr. Lisa Rossbacher, formerly of Dickinson College, as its president.

In 2005, Georgia Highlands College established a satellite campus hosted on the SPSU campus.

=== USG Merger ===
Eleven days before its planned vote, the Georgia Board of Regents of the University System of Georgia announced plans to consolidate Southern Polytechnic State University and Kennesaw State University into one university. Given that public comments are only allowed with fifteen days notice the Regents consolidation plans were perceived as a deceitful and secretive move by faculty and students. The presidents of the two universities were not told of the consolidation plans until "a week and a half" before the public announcement. Reasons given for the consolidation effort focused on cost savings despite the merger of eight other colleges into four only saving an estimated 0.1%.

=== Post-consolidation ===
Since the completion of the merger several scandals have plagued the newly augmented Kennesaw State. Less than two years after the consolidation President Dan Papp announced that he was stepping down as president of the university. His replacement, Sam Olens, was appointed amidst controversy over his total lack of education experience or background. This appointment came on the heels of an audit that revealed that outgoing president Papp had violated financial policy in receiving more than a half million dollars in early retirement payment. Before Papp's retirement announcement a seven-figure embezzlement scheme was uncovered and five KSU staffers and contractors were arrested. The amount lost equated to nearly 15% of the merger-based savings of 2013.

== Campus ==
The final location in the Marietta area is, as of 2020, mostly in the Marietta city limits.

Student housing
Dormitory facilities were provided at Southern Tech's first location in Chamblee, Georgia. They were created from former bachelor officers' quarters in facilities leased from the Atlanta Naval Air Station. When the campus moved in Marietta, housing was provided in residences originally built to house employees at the Bell Bomber plant (now the Lockheed Martin facility). The facilities were at that time being managed by the Marietta Housing Authority as low-income residences and were known as "Marietta Place." Construction for the Marietta campus' first dormitory began in 1964. The campus dormitories housed only men until 1974, when one end of the fourth floor of Howell dormitory was renovated for use by female students.

At the time of its merger with Kennesaw State University, Southern Polytechnic State University had five on-campus housing facilities for its students. These were Howell Hall, Hornet Village suites, University Commons apartments, University Courtyard apartments, and University Columns houses. These facilities are still used to house Kennesaw State University students.

Joe Mack Wilson Student Center (A Building)
The Joe Mack Wilson Student Center is located near the front entrance on the northern side of campus. It includes resources such as a University bookstore, a game room, eateries, various lounge areas, and many of KSU's departments and offices. Historically, it also housed student organizations and the WGHR radio station

Engineering Technology Center (Q Building)
On January 24, 2008, Governor Sunny Purdue recommended a little over $33 million toward the construction of a new building to house five programs: Electrical Engineering Technology, Computer Engineering Technology, Telecommunications Engineering Technology, Mechanical Engineering Technology, and Mechatronics Engineering. The facility, the Engineering Technology Center, covers 123,000-square-foot (11,400 m^{2}) and contains 36 labs, 12 classrooms, two seminar rooms, and a 200-seat lecture room. It was completed in December of 2010; it opened on the first day of classes for the spring semester of 2011. It is on the western side of the campus – north of the parking deck and Stingers Restaurant.

== Organization and administration ==
=== Faculty and staff ===
At the time of its consolidation with KSU, faculty at Southern Polytechnic State University were at a ratio of about 1 faculty member per 19 students. About 42.5% of students attended classes with fewer than 20 students. Every faculty member was required to have experience in relevant work or research of a topic to be qualified to teach at the school.

Between 2006, there was a general 70% to 30% ratio of male to female professors. In 2007–2008 male professors made up to $7,000 more than female professors on average. The gap between the difference in pay quickly decreased and by the 2009–2010 academic year the salary only differed by $300, $77,699 for males and $77,410 for females. Of the 48 full-time professors in 2007, 52% of them had tenure. The number of professors dropped from 48 to 44 in 2008; with the drop of full-time professors, only 44% of full-time faculty had tenure. It was recorded in 2010, that the number of full-time professors dropped again to 39, but the tenure rate remained the same. There were many awards given out at SPSU among the faculty including the Outstanding Faculty Award and the Employee Service Award. The university would choose a select group of faculty whose achievements had been noteworthy enough to receive the OFA. The OFA committee changed each year and was made up of the previous year's recipients. The Employee Service Award acknowledged the service and achievement of permanent employees at periodic intervals with appropriate ceremony and awards. A committee composed of representatives from the Staff Council and the Outstanding Faculty Awards Committee determined who received the awards and the ceremony date. Both awards were given out at the same ceremony at the end of spring term.

=== Student government ===
The SPSU Student Government Association was composed of elected and appointed undergraduate and graduate students. According to the organization's constitution, the mission of the Student Government Association was as follows:

The Student Government Association shall provide a systematic process of open communication among students, faculty, and administration. The SGA shall act as an advocate and insure that the students of the Southern Polytechnic State University are capable of exercising their lawful rights concerning their education, safety, and the allocation and expenditure of service and activities monies. The SGA shall endeavor to support Southern Polytechnic State University goals and missions through activities which demonstrate the value and contributions of the Southern Polytechnic State University to our community and state.

== Academics ==
Southern Polytechnic State University offered a broad range of undergraduate degree programs and several master's degree programs through its four schools and its Division of Engineering. At the time of its consolidation with KSU, it offered 24 online certificate, graduate, and undergraduate degree programs as well as the "eCore" program which was made up of the first two years of college courses completely online and is composed primarily of core classes.

=== Undergraduate programs ===
Southern Polytechnic State University's academic divisions were made of its School of Architecture and Construction Management; School of Computing and Software Engineering; School of Engineering Technology and Management; School of Arts and Sciences; and Division of Engineering. The most popular programs of study for undergraduate students are Architecture, Computer Science, Mechanical Engineering Technology, and Mechanical Engineering. The university's construction engineering program was one of nine in the nation, and its mechatronics engineering program was the first in Georgia. Other unique programs at SPSU included a five-year professionally accredited architecture degree and undergraduate degrees in surveying and mapping, systems engineering, and technical communication.

SPSU followed the University System of Georgia's Common Core program.

=== Graduate programs ===
At the time of consolidation, SPSU offered eleven graduate degree programs, nine graduate certificate programs, and four advanced graduate certificate programs. The eleven graduate programs awarded master's degrees in Accounting, Business Administration, Computer Science, Construction Management, Electrical Engineering Technology, Information and Instructional Design, Information Design and Communication, Information Technology, Quality Assurance, Software Engineering, and Systems Engineering. The university has been offering many of its master's degrees online since 1997.

=== Special learning opportunities ===
Southern Polytechnic State University offered special learning opportunities including teacher certification, distance learning, and study abroad programs. The university featured cross-enrollment programs with the Georgia Institute of Technology that enabled SPSU students to participate in the Army Reserve Officers' Training Corps, Naval Reserve Officers Training Corps, and Air Force Reserve Officer Training Corps programs hosted at the Georgia Institute of Technology's campus.

=== University Honors Program ===
The Southern Polytechnic State University University Honors Program offered the students smaller classroom, research studies with the professors, a separate study room, and more intellectual rigor. To join the program, students were required to have a minimum GPA of 3.2 at the freshman or sophomore level, 3.3 at the junior level, or 3.4 at the senior level. The University Honors Program offered two types of honors degrees:

- University Honors Scholar degree required 12 credit hours of honors course work and 6 credit hours of upper-division honors course work.
- Departmental Honors Scholar degree required completion of 6 hours of enriched upper-division coursework or directed study.

=== Rankings ===
According to the American Society for Engineering Education, in its 2010 edition of Profiles of Engineering and Engineering Technology Colleges, Southern Polytechnic State University was ranked third for the most engineering technology degrees awarded in the United States from 2001 to 2010 in total and third in the number awarded to female graduates in that same time. The university ranked second in the nation in total enrollment of students in engineering technology degree programs. In 2010, the school was ranked as one of the toughest universities in the U.S. as reported by CBS News.

== Student life ==
=== Student media ===
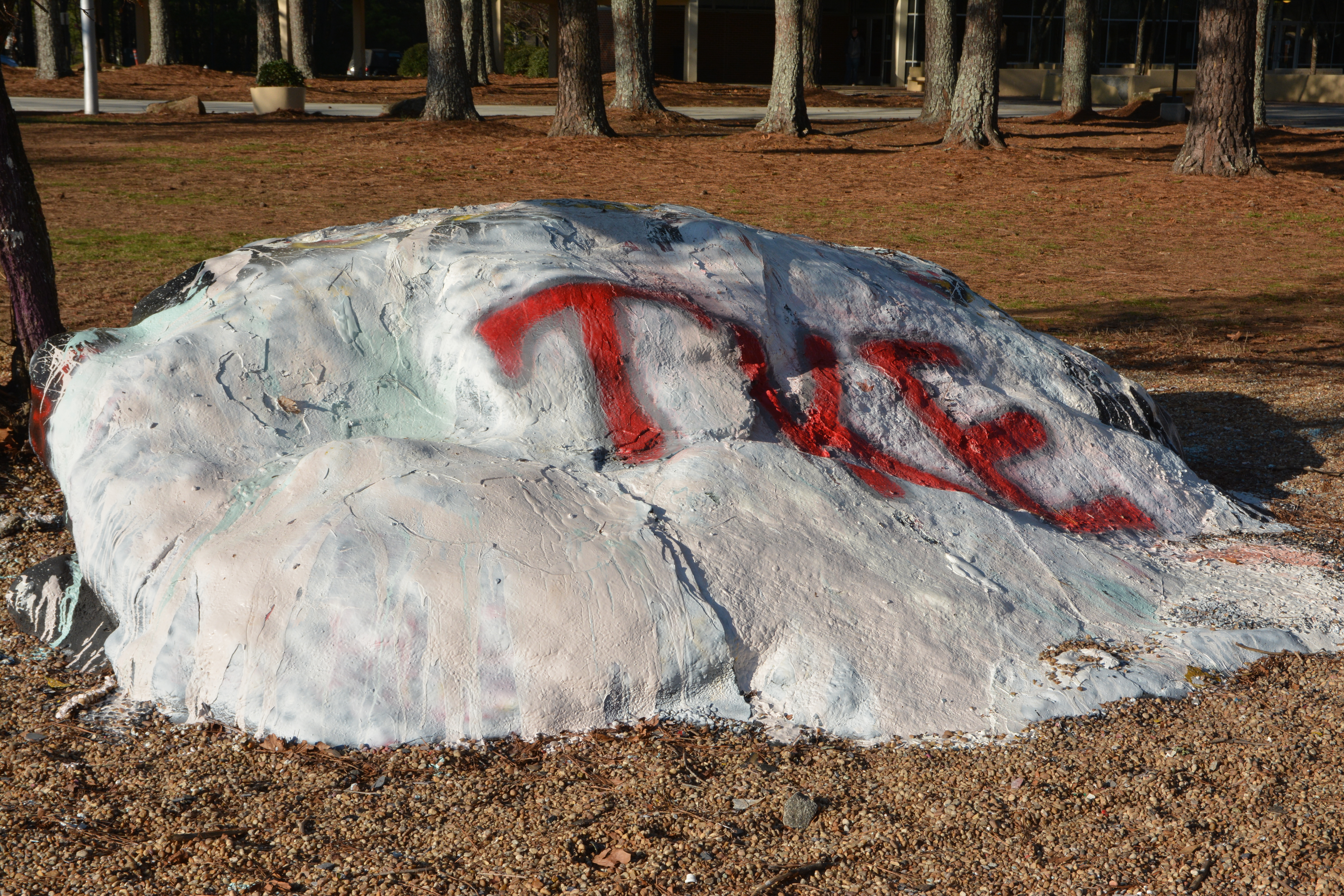
The Rock, on January 20, 2017

Southern Polytechnic historically had three student-run media outlets: a college radio station, a student newspaper, and a yearbook.

WGHR (Green Hornet Radio), the campus radio station, was a non-commercial educational station that began as "WSTB" in 1969 on carrier current AM, then became licensed as WGHR at 102.5 on the FM dial in 1981, moving to 100.7 in 1998. The station's broadcast license was canceled in 2001 because two commercial radio stations were allowed to take those FM frequencies, without compensation to the station or the school. WGHR continued to webcast after the cancellation. The station's radio studios and office were located in the student center. According to the SPSU Student Handbook, WGHR offered interested students an opportunity to gain broadcast and technical experience.

Southern Tech's first student newspaper was published under the title The Technician in September 1948. The publication changed titles several times, first to The Engineering Technician (beginning with the issue of February 20, 1964), then Whatsizname? (beginning with the issue of September 24, 1973), Southern Seeds (only one issue on October 15, 1975); Unnamed (styled ?, two issues beginning October 22, 1975), and finally The Sting (beginning with the issue of November 5, 1975). With the consolidation of Kennesaw State University and Southern Polytechnic State University in January 2015, student publications were integrated, and The Sting merged with KSU's publication The Talon to create a new campus lifestyle publication (published under the title The Sting. The Sting was later retitled The Peak with the September 2016 issue.

The Technician's Log (often shortened to The Log) was the yearbook from 1949 to 1997.

=== Student organizations ===
Fraternities and sororities

At the time of its merger with KSU, Southern Polytechnic State University was home to fourteen fraternities and sororities: seven of the North American Interfraternity Conference (IFC), two of the National Panhellenic Conference (NPC), and five of the National Pan-Hellenic Council (NPHC).

=== Bathtub race ===
In the 1960s one of the fraternities at Southern Polytechnic converted a cast-iron bath tub into a cooler for parties. When the tub became difficult to move they attached wheels to it. Some time after, other fraternities acquired their own cast-iron tubs, attached wheels, and the fraternities began to hold races around the perimeter of the school. In light of a growing liability risk the school ended the annual tub races in the early 1990s. In 2010 the SPSU alumni group resurrected the Bathtub Race, under the stipulation that the tubs be motorless.

=== Recreational ===
Southern Polytechnic State University offered intramural and club sports, which included many team and individual competitive programs throughout the year. Intramural sports consisted of basketball, racquetball, dodgeball, soccer, softball, and volleyball. The club sports are organized by individuals and groups on Southern Polytechnic's campus.

The recreational sports practices and competitions took place in the Recreation and Wellness Center, the Outdoor Recreation Complex, the Athletic Gymnasium, and Walter J. Kelly Jr. Field. The Recreation and Wellness Center opened in 1996.

== Athletics ==
The Southern Poly (SPSU) athletic teams were called the Runnin' Hornets, although "Runnin' Hornets" is often shortened to "Hornets" in use. The university was a member of the National Association of Intercollegiate Athletics (NAIA), primarily competing in the Southern States Athletic Conference (SSAC; formerly known as Georgia–Alabama–Carolina Conference (GACC) until after the 2003–04 school year) from 1999–2000 to 2013–14. The university's mascot was Sting, a green and black, anthropomorphic hornet bearing the stylized version of the university's logo on its chest.

SPSU competed in four intercollegiate varsity sports: Men's sports included baseball, basketball and soccer; while women's sports included basketball.

=== Men's soccer ===
The soccer team was established in 2007. After not receiving a tournament bid in the first season, the Hornets subsequently received three consecutive NAIA tournament berths. In its most notable season of 2009–2010, Southern Polytechnic State University's soccer team went 14–2–1 and went to the NAIA tournament. The team made it past the first round defeating Bryan College but lost in the round of 16 to Martin Methodist.

=== Baseball ===
The baseball team went 53–10 in the 2009 regular season, won the SSAC conference championship, and finished fifth in the NAIA World Series. Three players from the team were drafted by major league baseball teams (the Baltimore Orioles, Philadelphia Phillies, and Florida Marlins). Former players have also signed with other professional organizations such as the St. Louis Cardinals, New York Mets, Cincinnati Reds, and Chicago Cubs.

In 2014, the SPSU baseball team won the SSAC conference tournament. The team also won the Daytona Beach first round regional, earning a trip to the Avista NAIA World Series in the school's final year of collegiate athletics.

=== Men's basketball ===
In 2009, the men's basketball team went 23–5 in the regular season and 12–2 in the conference. They reached the SSAC tournament and won three straight games to become SSAC Champions. They qualified for the NAIA tournament, where they won three straight games before losing in the final four to Azusa Pacific University.

During the 2009 season, many of the athletes on the men's basketball team received personal awards. Jas Rogers won the award for the 2009–2010 SSAC Player of the Year. Brent Jennings, Xavier Dawson, and Jas Rogers were voted to the SSAC All-Conference Team, Darrien Beacham was voted to the 2010 Musco Lighting Champion of Character Team, and Jordan Lemons was voted to the SSAC All-Academic Team.

=== Women's basketball ===
In 2009, women's basketball went 26–4 in the regular season and 12–4 in the conference. They won the SSAC tournament championship and went on to the NAIA tournament. They won the first game but lost the next one to Union University.

During the 2009 season, many of the athletes on the women's basketball received personal awards. Athlete Crystal Davis was awarded the NAIA Scholar-Athlete and All-Academic Team awards, Brittany White was voted to the All-Freshmen Team, Dione Parks and Marisa Stoler were voted to the All-Conference Team, and the 6th Man Award was given to Dione Parks. The Newcomer of the Year award was awarded to Marisa Stoler, and Aurielle Morgan Musco was voted to Lighting Champion of Character Team. Also, the Coach of the Year award was awarded to Coach Nathan Teymer.

== Noted people ==
- Mike Garrett, former president and CEO of Georgia Power, one of the leading producers of electricity in the United States.
- Chris Owens of Lowe Engineers, who previously served as a member of the City Council of Alpharetta, Georgia
- John Leverett, the founding and head of engineering at Panoz Auto Development graduated in 1993.
- Jeff Glover, Steve Newey, and Brandon Fry - all work at the highest levels of international Sports Car and Indy Car racing.
- Craig "Huey" Stewart, founder of Marietta Motorsports, attended the university. He and John Leverett of Panoz Auto Development are noted for having founded Southern Polytechnic State University's Formula SAE competition team in 1992..
- President Emerita Dr. Lisa Rossbacher
