= Sanford Stadium =

Stadium in Athens, Georgia US

Coordinates: 33°56′59.29″N 83°22′24.11″W

- Between the Hedges
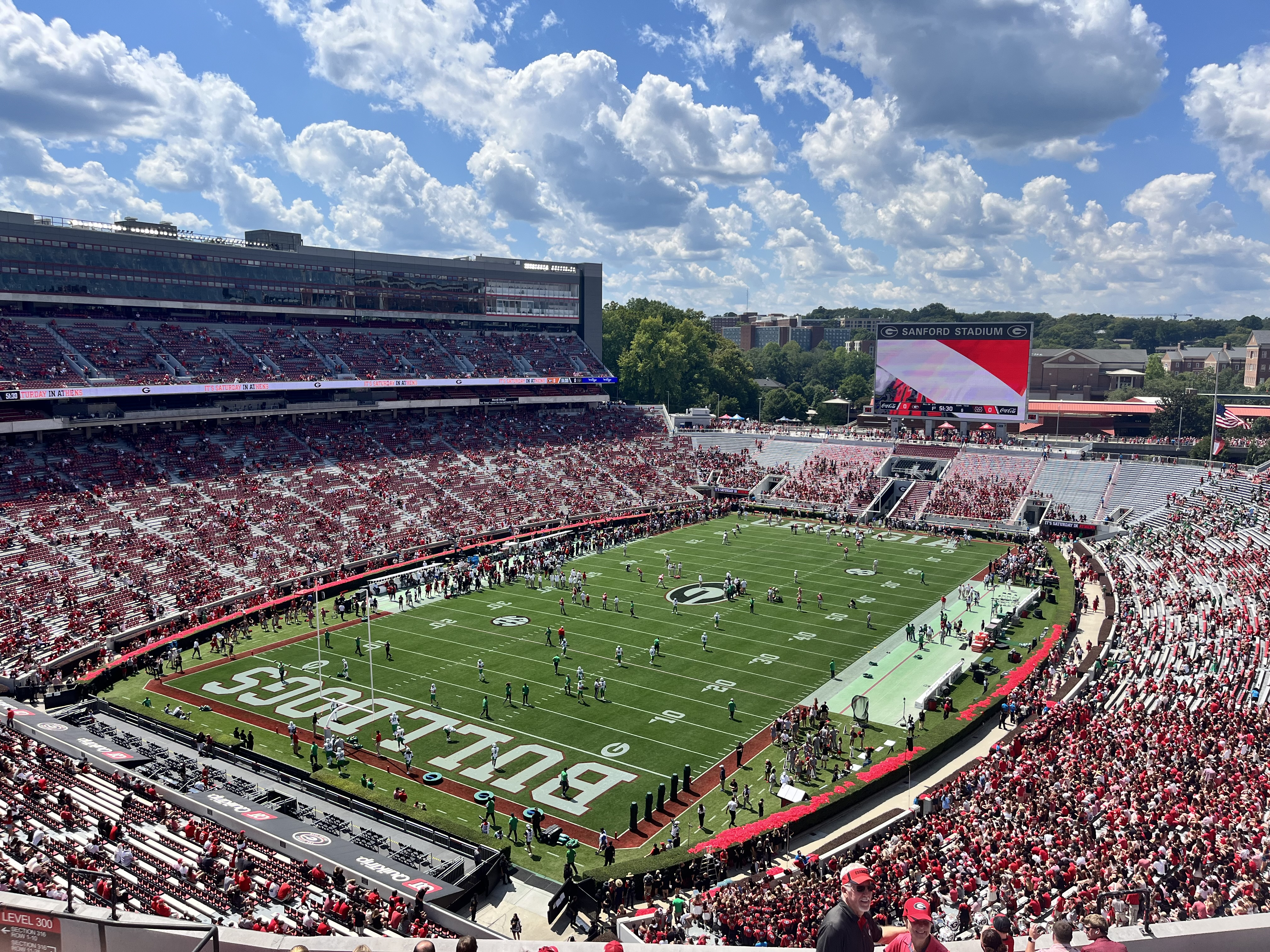
- Sanford Stadium, August 2025
- Interactive map of Sanford Stadium
- Full name: Dooley Field at Sanford Stadium
- Location: Sanford Dr and Field St, Athens, Georgia 30602 Coordinates 33°56'59.29"N 83°22'24.11"W
- Capacity: 93,033 (2024–present) Former List: 30,000 (1929–1948); 36,000 (1949–1963); 43,621 (1964–1966); 59,200 (1967–1980); 82,122 (1981–1990); 85,434 (1991–1993); 86,117 (1994–1999); 86,520 (2000–2002); 92,058 (2003); 92,746 (2004–2023)
- Surface: Tifton 419 Bermuda Grass
- Record attendance: September 21, 2019 vs. Notre Dame (93,246)

Construction
- Groundbreaking: 1928
- Opened: October 12, 1929
- Renovated: 1994, 2018
- Expanded: 1949, 1964, 1967, 1981, 1991, 1994, 2000, 2003, 2018
- Cost: US$360,000 ($6.75 million in 2025 dollars)
- Architects: Atwood and Nash; Heery International (1967 expansion)

Tenant
- Georgia Bulldogs (NCAA) (1929–present)

Dooley Field at Sanford Stadium is the on-campus playing venue for football at the University of Georgia (UGA) in Athens, Georgia, United States. The 93,033-seat stadium is the ninth-largest American football stadium in the NCAA (and in the United States), and the 15th-largest such stadium in the world. Games played there are said to be played "between the hedges" due to the field being surrounded by privet hedges, which have been a part of the design of the stadium since it opened in 1929. The current generation of hedges were planted in 2024 (completed on May 4, 2024, as an NIL fundraising event) after the originals were taken out to accommodate the soccer tournaments for the 1996 Summer Olympics. The stadium is often considered one of college football's "best, loudest, and most intimidating atmospheres".

Whereas many college football stadiums have artificial playing surfaces, Sanford Stadium from the outset had, and continues to have, a natural grass surface, planted with Tifton 419 Bermuda Grass.

== History ==
The stadium is named for Steadman Vincent Sanford, a major early force behind UGA athletics. Sanford arrived at the University of Georgia as an English instructor in 1903. He later became the faculty representative to the athletics committee and would eventually become president of the university and chancellor of the entire University System of Georgia. In 1911, he moved the university's football venue from its first location, Herty Field, to a location at the center of campus which was named Sanford Field in his honor.

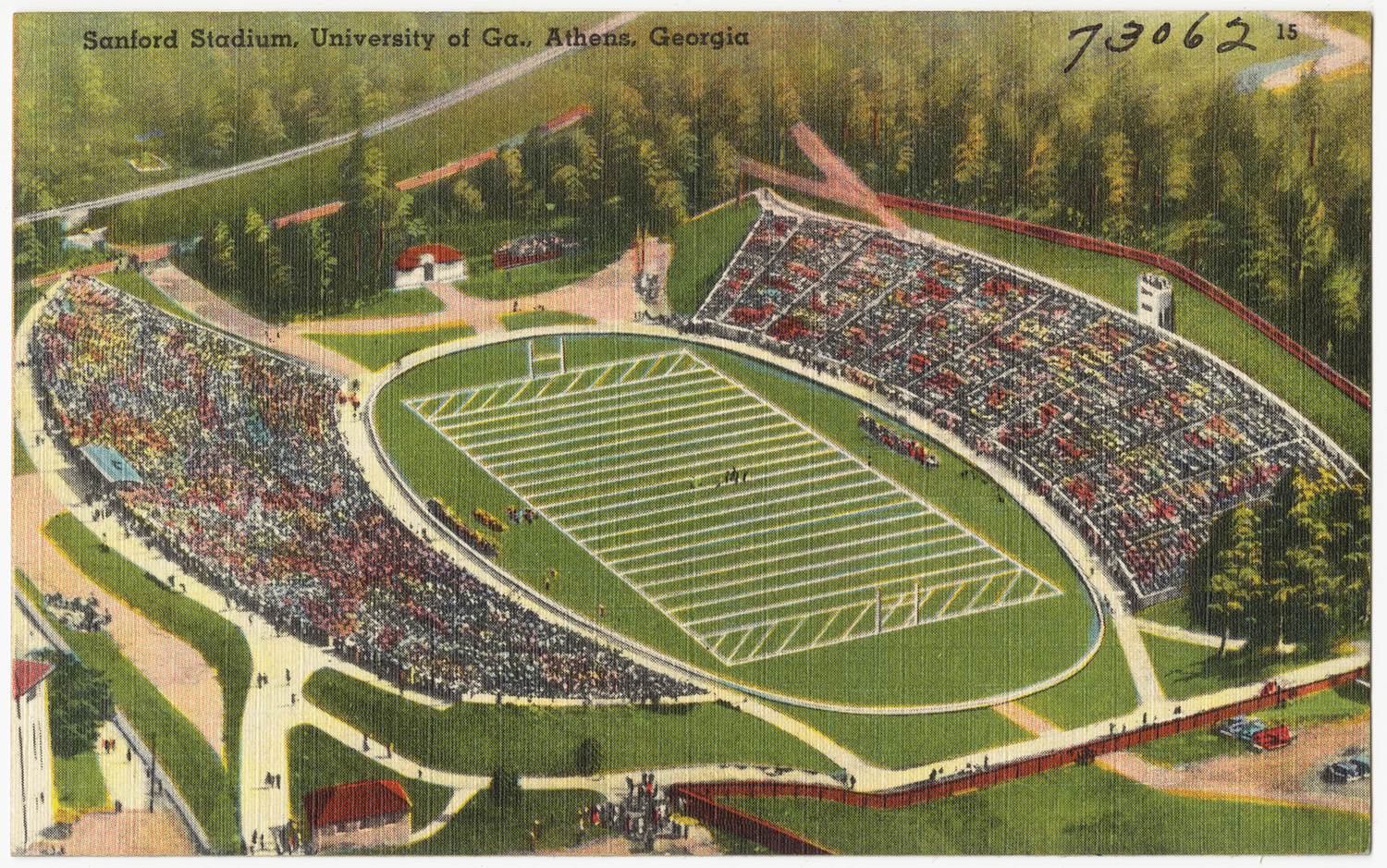
Early postcard of Sanford Stadium, c. 1930–1945

During the 1920s, Sanford Field was unable to accommodate the large crowds attending Georgia football games, particularly those against in-state rival Georgia Tech. Georgia was often forced to play its annual games against Tech at Grant Field in Atlanta. Following Georgia's 12–0 loss to Georgia Tech during its undefeated 1927 season, Sanford pushed for the construction of a larger stadium.

In 1928, members of the athletic association signed notes guaranteeing a bank loan to finance construction, with the guarantors receiving lifetime seats. A $150,000 loan, supported by fans and alumni, helped finance the stadium's $360,000 construction cost.

The stadium was constructed in a natural valley near Sanford Field between the university's North and Science campuses. Tanyard Creek, which ran through the area, was enclosed in a concrete culvert beneath the playing field. The surrounding slopes reduced construction costs by allowing the stands to be built into the natural terrain. T. C. Atwood of Chapel Hill, North Carolina, designed the 30,000-seat stadium, which was constructed in part using convict labor, as were many public works projects of that era.

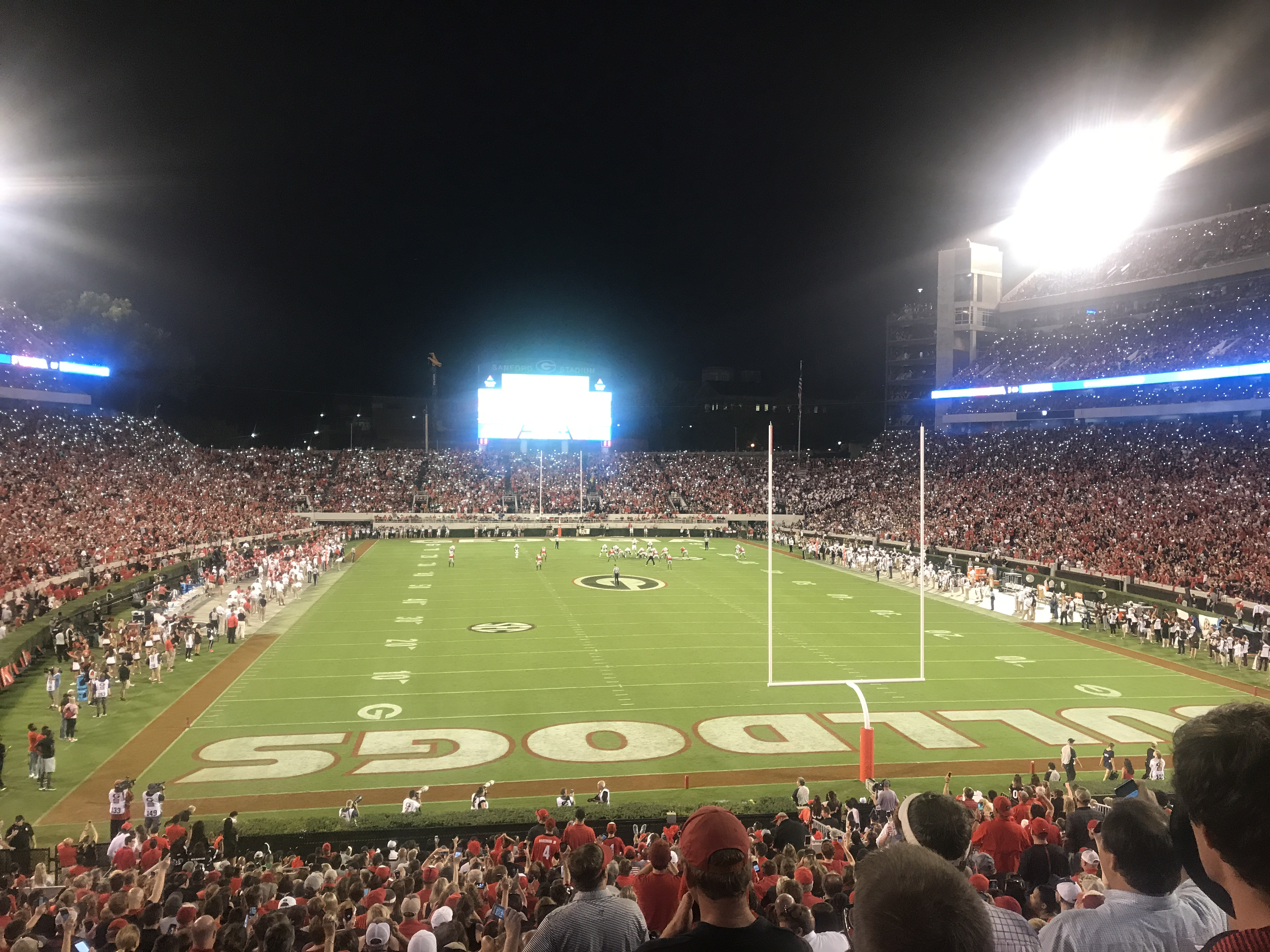
Georgia fans "light up" Sanford Stadium with their cell phones at night during a game against Mississippi State in 2017.

Sanford Stadium opened on October 12, 1929, when Georgia defeated Yale 15–0 before a crowd of more than 30,000. The crowd was reportedly the largest to attend a college football game in the South at the time, and governors from nine Southern states also were in attendance. Yale donated its share of the game receipts to Georgia to help pay off the construction loans, which was paid off within five years.

I have played in many stadiums, but to me there are only two special stadiums – Yankee Stadium in New York and Sanford Stadium in Athens, and there is no comparison between the two. There is no place in the world precisely like the grass that grows between the hedges in Athens, Georgia.

— Fran Tarkenton

During the era of passenger rail travel, executives of the Central of Georgia Railway parked the company's presidential railcar, Atlanta, on tracks overlooking the stadium's end zone. During the 1970s, fans known as the "Track People" watched games from the same railroad tracks until the stadium's 1981 expansion enclosed the end zone and blocked their view of the field.

In May 2019, university officials announced that the playing surface of Sanford Stadium would be named in honor of former long time Bulldog head coach and athletic director Vince Dooley. The field was officially dedicated during a pregame ceremony before Georgia's home opener on September 7, 2019.

On September 21, 2019, Sanford Stadium set its attendance record of 93,246 during Georgia's victory over Notre Dame. Aluminum bleachers were added to raise the capacity of the stadium by 500 due to the agreement between Georgia and Notre Dame to allocate 8,000 visitor tickets for each game in the home and away series.

On August 20, 2026, the stadium hosted Soccer at Sanford, a regular-season women's soccer match between the Georgia Bulldogs and James Madison Dukes. Georgia won the match 6–0 before a crowd of 25,433, setting the NCAA attendance record for a collegiate soccer match. The previous women's collegiate soccer attendance record was 14,410, set during the 1999 NCAA Division I Women's Soccer Championship match between North Carolina and Notre Dame, while the previous overall NCAA record was 22,512 for a men's match between Saint Louis and SIU Edwardsville at Busch Stadium in St. Louis.

== Stadium expansions ==
The original stadium consisted of the lower half of the current facility's grandstand seats. In 1940, field-level lights were added, and Georgia played its first night game against Kentucky to a 7–7 tie. The stadium underwent its first expansion in 1949, when 6,000 seats were added to the south side, increasing its capacity to 36,000.

Following Vince Dooley's arrival as Georgia's head coach in 1964, the university began another series of improvements. The field-level lights were removed, and 7,621 bleacher seats were added in the end zones, increasing capacity to 43,621. Architects Heery and Heery of Atlanta were then hired to plan a major expansion. Despite the stadium's proximity to surrounding academic buildings, upper decks were added to the grandstands in 1967 without requiring the demolition or alteration of nearby structures. The $3 million project added 19,640 seats, a press box, and club seating, increasing capacity to 59,000. The expanded stadium opened with Georgia's victory over Mississippi State that year.

In 1981, the east end zone was enclosed in an $11.5 million project that added 19,000 seats and increased capacity to 82,122. The first game following the expansion was Georgia's 44–0 victory over Tennessee on September 5, 1981. Stadium lighting was also reinstalled above the upper deck rather than at field level. Georgia played its first game under the new lighting system on September 6, 1982, defeating Clemson 13–7.

In 1991, a portion of the west endzone was enclosed, creating a partial bowl around the lower level of the stadium. The west stands could not be completely enclosed due to the proximity of Gillis Bridge, a major campus transportation route. The $3.7 million expansion added 4,205 seats and increased capacity to 85,434.

Thirty luxury suites were added above the south stands in 1994. The number was increased to 50 in 2000. Together, the projects cost $18 million and raised the stadium's capacity to 86,520. In 2003, another upper deck was constructed on the north side, adding 5,500 seats at a cost of $25 million and increasing capacity to 92,058. The stadium reached a capacity of 92,746 in 2004 after 27 SkySuites were added to the north side at a cost of $8 million.

In 2005, a video display was installed above the west end zone and ribbon boards were added along the sides of the stadium. The video board underwent a $1.4 million renovation before the 2011 season, expanding its display area and adding high-definition capability.

On February 14, 2017, the UGA Athletic Board approved a $63 million expansion to renovate the west side of the stadium. The approved design relocated the locker room from the east side to the west side and added a new plaza and recruiting pavilion. Construction began following the 2017 season and was officially opened with a ribbon-cutting ceremony on August 31, 2018. In 2019, the floodlighting system was upgraded to a state-of-the-art LED system, which cost around $950,000. The first game that demonstrated them was the Notre Dame game on September 21, 2019.

In 2022, the university announced additional renovations to be completed by the 2024 season. The project expanded the 100-level south sideline concourse and Gate 9, added restrooms, created the 50 Yard Line Club, and constructed a new press box and premium seating areas. The renovation added 287 seats, increasing the stadium's capacity to 93,033.

== Notable events ==
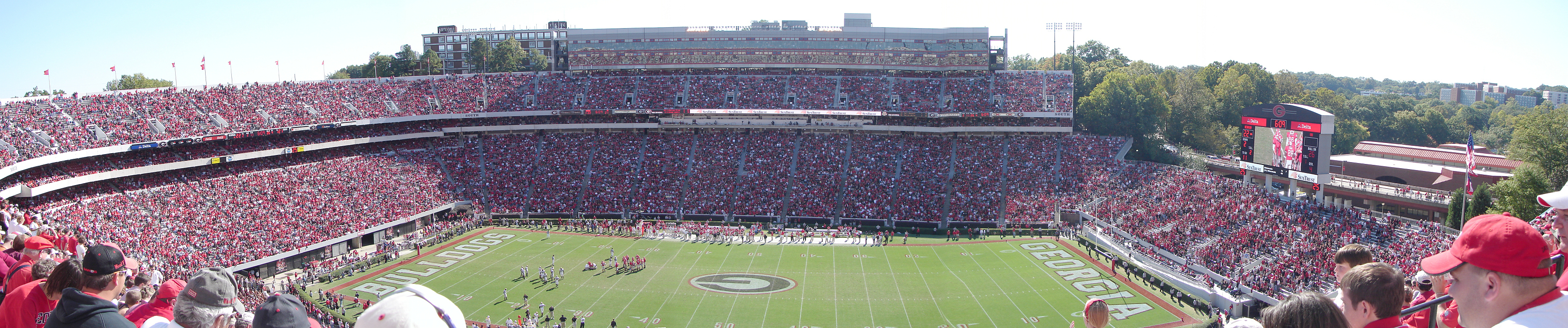
Panoramic view from Sanford's upper North Deck during the October 14, 2006, home game against the Vanderbilt Commodores. The views of Georgia's campus from the open end zone have led many to label Sanford as college football's most beautiful on-campus stadium
- October 12, 1929: In the first game played at Sanford Stadium, Georgia upset heavily favored Yale 15–0.
- October 25, 1940: Georgia tied Kentucky 7–7 in the first night game played at Sanford Stadium.
- November 14, 1959: Fran Tarkenton threw a game-winning touchdown pass to Bill Heron in the final seconds as Georgia defeated Auburn 14–13 to clinch the SEC championship.
- September 9, 1965: Georgia defeated Bear Bryant's defending national champion Alabama team 18–17, scoring on a 73-yard hook-and-lateral touchdown and subsequent two-point conversion in the fourth quarter.
- September 22, 1984: Kevin Butler kicked a 60-yard field goal as time expired to give Georgia a victory over No. 2 Clemson.
- October 28, 1995: Florida became the first team to score at least 50 points against Georgia at Sanford Stadium, defeating the Bulldogs 52–17. The Gators' 52 points remain the most scored by an opponent against Georgia at the stadium.
- October 7, 2000: Georgia ended a nine-game losing streak against Tennessee with a 21–10 victory. Fans rushed the field and tore down the goalposts following the game.
- November 10, 2007: Georgia wore black jerseys for the first time in program history and defeated No. 20 Auburn 45–20 in the program's first "Blackout" game.
- September 7, 2019: The playing surface was officially dedicated as Dooley Field in honor of former Georgia head coach and athletic director Vince Dooley.
- September 21, 2019: Georgia defeated No. 7 Notre Dame 23–17 before a record crowd of 93,246.
- November 5, 2022: AP No. 1 Georgia defeated AP No. 2 Tennessee in a matchup between the top two teams in the AP Poll.
- November 29, 2024: Georgia defeated Georgia Tech 44–42 in eight overtimes, the longest game in Southeastern Conference history and the second-longest in FBS history.
- April 25, 2026: Jason Aldean and Luke Bryan co-headlined Live Between the Hedges, the second major concert held at the stadium, drawing more than 60,000 spectators.
- August 20, 2026: Georgia defeated James Madison 6–0 in the Soccer at Sanford match before 25,433 spectators, setting the NCAA attendance record for a collegiate soccer match.

== 1996 Summer Olympics ==
The stadium played host to the Olympic medal competition of men's and women's association football at the 1996 Summer Olympics. Because the required dimensions of an association football field are wider than those of an American football field, the hedges surrounding the field had to be removed. This proved to be a controversial measure, as it had not been general public knowledge that the hedges would have to be removed to accommodate the Olympic football competition. In preparation for this necessity, cuttings were taken from the original hedges, three years prior to the Olympics, and cultivated at a secret, off-campus site. It was later discovered that this 'secret site' were in fact two sites - one 70 miles (110 km) away at R.A. Dudley Nurseries in Thomson, Georgia and another 280 miles (450 km) away at Hackney Nursery in Quincy, Florida; both run by alumni. During the Olympics, Nigeria and the United States won the men's and women's football gold medals, respectively, at the hedge-less stadium. Once the Olympics were over, the newly grown hedges were transplanted from the two nurseries to the stadium. Sanford Stadium told the United States Football Federation it would not be interested in future FIFA World Cup matches being held at the stadium, with an American-held tourney being held in 2026; Mercedes-Benz Stadium in Atlanta ultimately hosted 8 matches.

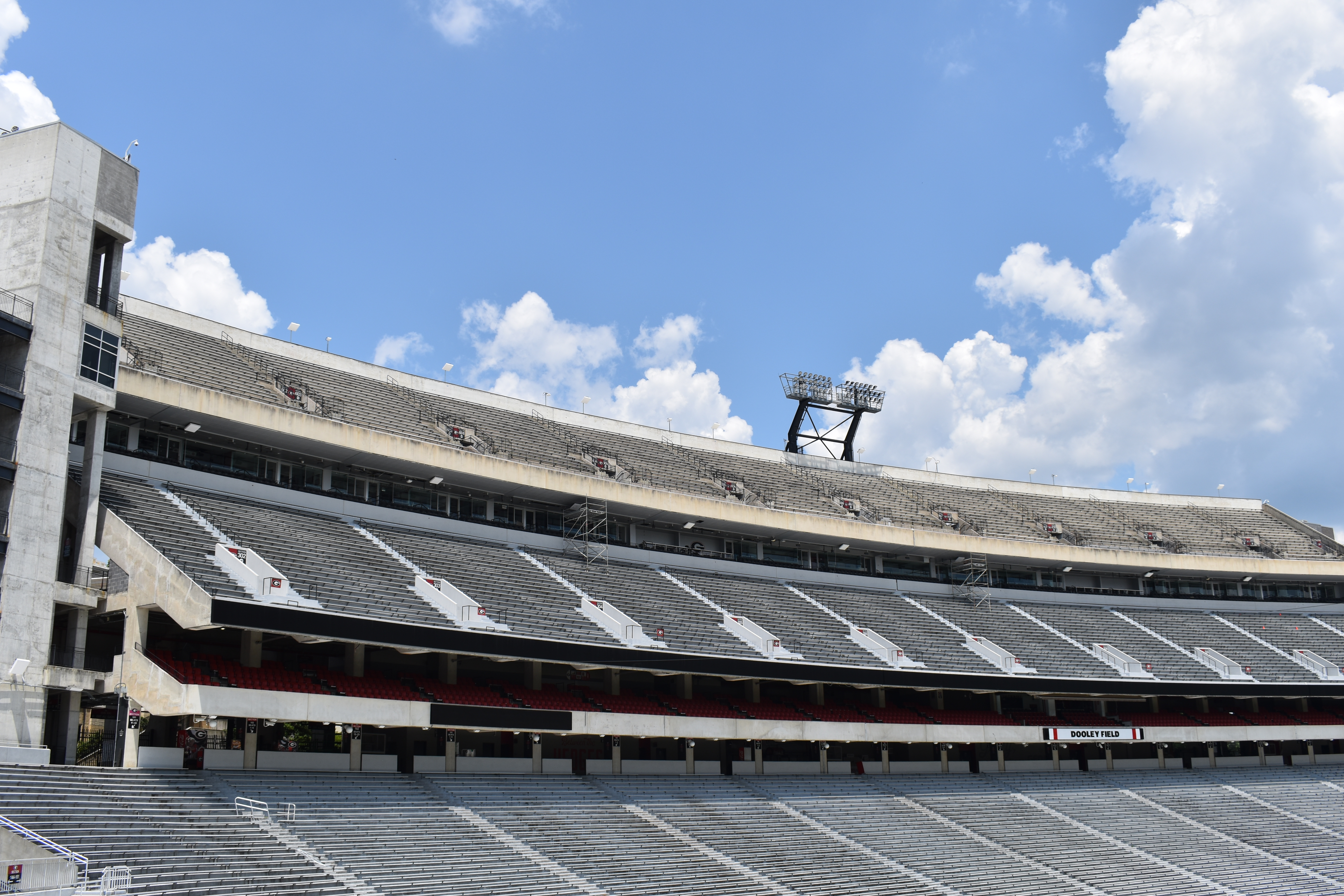
The north stands of Sanford Stadium seen in July 2020

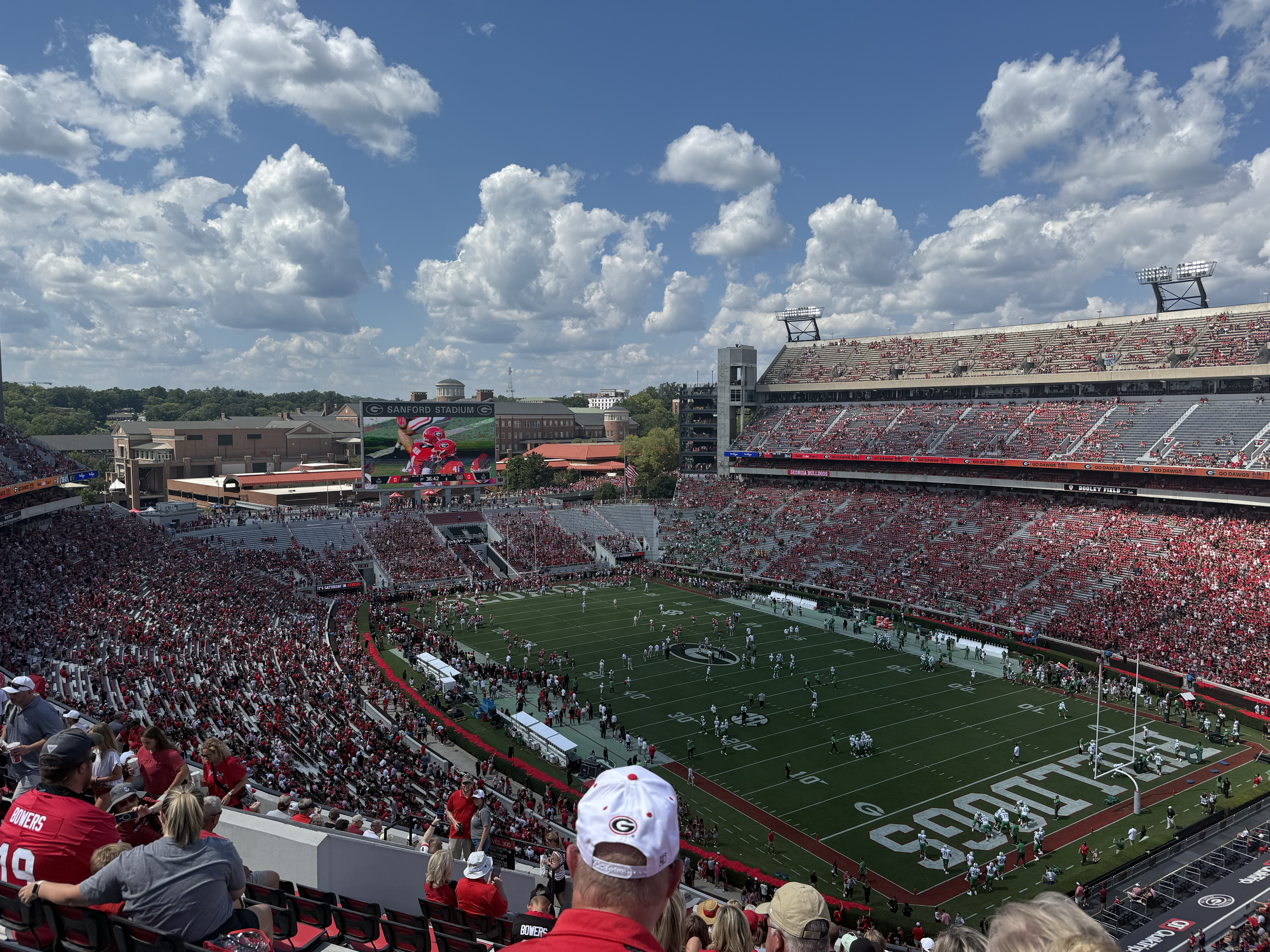
Sanford Stadium in August 2025

== Features ==
- Sanford Stadium's privet hedges have surrounded the playing field since the stadium's inaugural game against Yale in 1929, giving rise to the nickname "Between the Hedges." The idea for the hedges is credited to former Georgia athletic department business manager Charlie Martin, who was inspired by the rosebushes surrounding the field at the Rose Bowl during a 1926 visit. Because roses were not well suited to Athens's climate, privet hedges were planted around the field. A chain-link fence concealed within the hedges also serves as a barrier between the field and spectators.
- Georgia's deceased Uga mascots are entombed in a mausoleum in the southwest corner of the stadium.
- Sanford Stadium is one of the few college football stadiums with an east–west field orientation rather than a north–south orientation. Kroger Field is the only other stadium in the Southeastern Conference with this orientation.
- The goal-line markers at each end of the field feature Georgia's oval "G" logo.
- Until the 1995 season, the field featured only the markings required for play, without a midfield logo or lettering in the end zones.

== See also ==
- Georgia Bulldogs football
- List of NCAA Division I FBS football stadiums
- Lists of stadiums

Events and tenants
Preceded by Camp Nou; Barcelona	Summer Olympics; Football Men's Finals (Sanford Stadium); 1996	Succeeded by Sydney Olympic Stadium; Sydney
Preceded by	Summer Olympics; Football Women's Finals (Sanford Stadium); 1996	Succeeded by Sydney Football Stadium; Sydney
