= Steadman Vincent Sanford =

American academic and administrator (1871–1945)

President of the University of Georgia
- In office 1932–1935
- Preceded by: Charles Mercer Snelling
- Succeeded by: Harmon White Caldwell

Personal details
- Born: August 24, 1871 Covington, Georgia, U.S.
- Died: September 15, 1945 (aged 74) Atlanta, Georgia, U.S.
- Education: Mercer University

Steadman Vincent Sanford (August 24, 1871 – September 15, 1945) was President of the University of Georgia (UGA) in Athens from 1932 until 1935. He subsequently served as Chancellor of the University System of Georgia from 1935 until 1945.

== Early life, education and career ==
Sanford was born in Covington, Georgia, in 1871. He enrolled at Mercer University at the age of fifteen and earned a Bachelor of Arts in English in 1890.

Upon graduation from Mercer, Sanford became the principal of the Male Academy in Marietta, Georgia (1890 to 1892), then served as principal of Marietta High School (1892–1903) and as superintendent of Marietta Public Schools (1897–1903).

In 1903, Sanford came to the university as an English literature instructor. He was promoted to Adjunct Professor in 1907. In 1913, the university awarded him a full professorship as well as the honorary degree of Doctor of Letters (Hon. Litt. D.) the following year. Sanford also became a professor of journalism with intentions to create a new school for that field.

In 1921, he founded the Henry W. Grady School of Journalism (initially as a department) and served as its head until 1926 when he became president of UGA's Franklin College and dean of the university. He then assumed the presidency of the university in 1932. Dawson Hall (1932) and Joseph E. Brown Hall (1932) were both opened during Sanford's inaugural year as president.

== Administrative career ==
Sanford finally ascended to chancellor of the University System starting in 1935. His tenure oversaw a tremendous period of growth in construction at schools all over Georgia; however, he clashed with former governor of Georgia Eugene Talmadge over control of the authority to set policy at UGA and elsewhere in the University System. In 1945, while in Atlanta for a meeting of the Georgia Board of Regents, Sanford suffered a cerebral hemorrhage and died. He is buried in the Marietta City Cemetery (Citizens Cemetery).

== Athletic contributions ==
Sanford took on the position of faculty chairman of athletics in 1907 and performed those duties until his ascendancy to the UGA presidency in 1932. He was instrumental in the formation of the Southern Conference and its progeny, the Southeastern Conference. The building of the first baseball stadium (Sanford Field), a basketball facility (Woodruff Hall in 1924) and the current football venue (Sanford Stadium) were all due to Steadman Sanford.

== Notes ==
| Preceded by Charles Mercer Snelling | President of the University of Georgia; 1932 — 1935 | Succeeded by Harmon White Caldwell |
