= University of Georgia School of Computing =

Coordinates: 33.94599°N 83.37525°W

School of Computing
- Former name: Computer Science Department
- Type: Public
- Established: July 1, 2022
- Academic affiliations: University of Georgia, Franklin College of Arts and Sciences, College of Engineering
- Director: Dr. Gagan Agrawal
- Undergraduates: 1980
- Postgraduates: 254
- Location: Athens, Georgia, Georgia, USA
- Website: www.cs.uga.edu

The School of Computing at the University of Georgia, formerly known as the Computer Science Department, is jointly administered by the Franklin College of Arts and Sciences and College of Engineering following a proposal to elevate the department into its own school due to rapid growth in the major. While the original Computer Science department was established in 1984, the School of Computing was established on July 1, 2022. The university has been designated a National Center of Academic Excellence in Cyber Defense Research by the National Security Agency and Department of Homeland Security, one of 71 institutions nationwide to hold the designation. The graduate computer science program was ranked 76th in the United States in the 2026 U.S. News & World Report rankings.

== Academics ==
The School of Computing offers two undergraduate degrees: a Bachelor of Science in Computer Science and a Bachelor of Science in Data Science. At the graduate level, the school offers a Master of Science in Computer Science (thesis and non-thesis options), a Master of Science in Cybersecurity and Privacy (non-thesis), a Master in Applied Mathematical Sciences, and a Doctor of Philosophy in Computer Science.

== History ==
Computer Science was, as of September 2016, the third-most enrolled major at the University of Georgia. The number of undergraduates enrolled as Computer Science majors increased from 614 in fall 2014 to 751 in fall 2015 (an increase of 22%). In 2016, the Computer Science department hired additional faculty in response to enrollment growth and rising demand for computing graduates. The hiring was prompted in part by a student petition, which amassed over 1,000 signatures, requesting more funding and instructors from the department head and the dean of the Franklin College of Arts and Sciences. As enrollment continued to grow, Provost S. Jack Hu charged a seven-member Task Force on the Future of Computing with evaluating the department's future. The task force, comprising faculty and academic leaders from the Franklin College and the College of Engineering, recommended elevation to a school, and the University of Georgia formally established the School of Computing on July 1, 2022.

== Research ==
=== Small Satellite Research Laboratory ===
The UGA Small Satellite Research Laboratory was founded in 2016 and has grown to include over 100 students from multiple disciplines. The laboratory's first satellite, SPOC (Spectral Ocean Color), launched aboard an Antares rocket on October 2, 2020 and was deployed from the International Space Station in November 2020.

== Career outcomes ==
According to the UGA Career Center, the median starting salary for Class of 2023 computer science graduates was $85,000.

== Student organizations ==
=== Hackathons ===
In 2015, the University of Georgia's first hackathon was organized by a student organization known as UGAHacks, which is endorsed by Major League Hacking. The event has continued to grow annually; its 10th edition in February 2025 drew over 500 participants and 150 project submissions, with 12 corporate sponsors.

=== Professional Organizations ===
The University of Georgia has chapters of the Association for Computing Machinery and the Institute of Electrical and Electronics Engineers that operate at the school.
