= Thomas A. Fanning =

American businessman

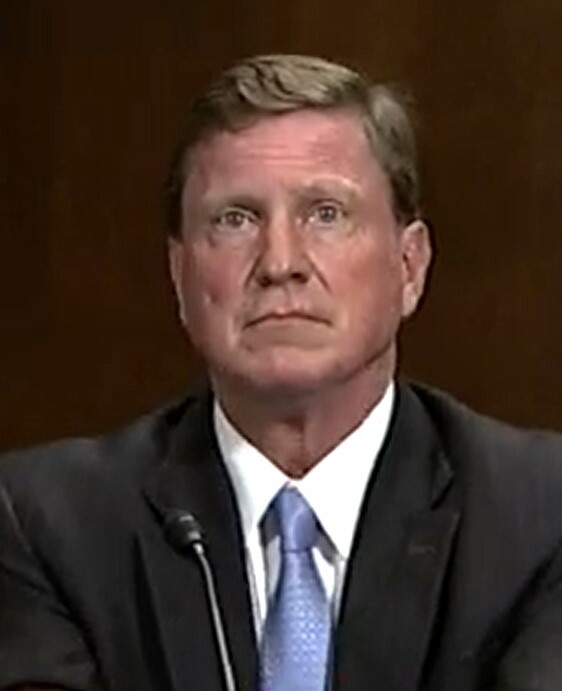
- Fanning in 2018
- Born: Morristown, New Jersey, U.S.
- Education: Georgia Institute of Technology (BS, MS)
- Known for: Chairman, CEO, and President of Southern Company, Chancellor of University System of Georgia
- Spouse: Sarah Novascone

Thomas A. Fanning (a.k.a. Tom Fanning) is a former executive chairman of Southern Company, the second largest utility company in the United States in terms of customer base, with 9 million gas and electric utility customers served by subsidiaries in nine states. He currently serves as the 15th Chancellor of the University System of Georgia.

== Early life ==
Thomas A. Fanning was born in Morristown, New Jersey. He moved to the metropolitan Atlanta area when he was in elementary school, and attended Sandy Springs High School. He graduated from the Georgia Institute of Technology, where he also received a master's degree.

== Career ==
Fanning started his career as a financial analyst at Southern Company in 1980. He moved to Southern Company's then international subsidiary in 1986, serving first as treasurer and later in other positions. During this period, Fanning led a team that acquired an interest in the Loy Yang B Power Station in Victoria, Australia. After serving as chief information officer from 1995 to 1997 and senior vice president of strategy from 1997 to 1999 for Southern Company, he became chief financial officer of one of its subsidiaries, Mississippi Power, in 1999, and executive vice president, treasurer and chief financial officer of another subsidiary Georgia Power from 1999 to 2002. He then served as president and CEO of another subsidiary, Gulf Power Company from 2002 to 2003. He was appointed as executive vice president of Southern Company in 2003. He also served as its treasurer from 2003 to 2007, and as its chief financial officer 2003 to 2008. He was appointed as its chief operating officer in 2008.

Fanning became president of Southern Company in August 2010, and chairman and chief executive officer in December 2010. He has pursued a strategy based on developing a diverse portfolio of energy resources that includes nuclear, coal, natural gas, renewables and energy efficiency, and leveraging energy innovation to serve customers. Since becoming CEO of Southern Company, Fanning, who was paid a salary of over $15,000,000 a year, has called for a national energy policy to support clean, safe, reliable and affordable energy. In an interview with EnergyWire in July 2016, Fanning said, "The greatest advantage America has right now, beyond technology innovation as a core principle, is energy policy. There is no more important energy policy right now than the electrification of the United States and doing it right. If we do energy policy right, we really can provide to the citizens of the United States hope."

In 2015, Fanning announced the merger of Southern Company and AGL Resources Inc., which upon completion in July 2016 created a combined company with operations in 18 states, including electric and gas utilities in nine states, among the poorest in the nation, serving 9 million customers, and 32,500 employees.

Under Fanning, Southern Company has opened the Energy Innovation Center in Atlanta, where the company and partners are working on products and services such as electric transportation, home automation, energy efficiency and renewables.

Fanning is helping lead efforts within the electric utility industry to coordinate plans to protect critical infrastructure from physical and cyber threats. Writing in Electric Perspectives magazine in 2016, Fanning said the electric utility industry is working closely with the government to keep the U.S. electric grid safe from attacks. Industry-government cooperation, he said, is "exceedingly important to ensuring the security of the electric system that is so essential to the life, health and safety of all Americans."

Fanning served on the board of directors of the St. Joe Company, a land development company and Florida's second largest private landowner, from 2005 to 2011. He has served on the board of directors of the Federal Reserve Bank of Atlanta since 2013, and as chairman since 2015. He serves on the board of directors of the Vulcan Materials Company, a construction aggregates company headquartered in Birmingham, Alabama. He is on the Georgia Tech Scheller College of Business advisory board and the board of trustees for the Georgia Tech Foundation. Fanning is a member of the Business Roundtable.

In 2013, Fanning was ranked No. 4 by PowerEngineering among the industry's 25 most influential people over the past 25 years. He was a recipient of the 2015 John D. Dingell Award from the National Labor and Management Public Affairs Committee. He was one of the 2016 100 Most Influential Georgians presented by Georgia Trend magazine. Fanning received the Dean's Appreciation Award in 2015 from the Georgia Tech College of Engineering.

== Philanthropy ==
Fanning is a member of the United Way of Greater Atlanta Tocqueville Society. He is involved in support of Mercy Care, which provides health care to the poor and marginalized in Atlanta. He is active as a volunteer coach and supporter of the Northside Youth Organization, which offers youth sports programs including football, baseball, basketball, softball, and cheerleading.
