= H. Boyd McWhorter =

American academic administrator

Boyd McWhorter

4th Commissioner of the Southeastern Conference
- In office September 1, 1972 – 1986
- Preceded by: Tonto Coleman
- Succeeded by: Harvey Schiller

Dean of the Franklin College of Arts and Sciences
- In office 1968–1972

Personal details
- Born: Hezzie Boyd McWhorter; May 8, 1923 Cochran, Georgia, U.S.
- Died: July 23, 1994 (aged 71) Athens, Georgia, U.S.
- Resting place: Oconee Hill Cemetery; Athens, Georgia
- Education: North Georgia College; United States Naval Academy (BS); University of Georgia (MA); University of Texas at Austin (PhD)

Military service
- Allegiance: United States
- Branch/service: United States Navy
- Battles/wars: World War II; Korean War

Hezzie Boyd McWhorter (May 8, 1923 – July 23, 1994) was an American academic administrator who was commissioner of the Southeastern Conference from 1972 to 1986.

== Early life ==
McWhorter was born on May 8, 1923 in Cochran, Georgia. He attended North Georgia College and was a member of the school's basketball team. He then received an appointment to the United States Naval Academy. He graduated in 1945 and briefly served aboard the USS Hornet during World War II. He was on active duty until 1947, then served in the United States Naval Reserve. He received his master degree in English from the University of Georgia in 1949.

== Career ==
McWhorter joined the Georgia faculty in 1949. He was on active duty in the Navy from 1951 to 1953. In 1960, he earned his doctorate from the University of Texas at Austin. In 1965, he was appointed faculty chairman of athletics. In 1968, he was appointed dean of the Franklin College of Arts and Sciences.

On June 23, 1972, McWhorter was elected commissioner of the Southeastern Conference. He succeeded the retiring Tonto Coleman on September 1, 1972. McWhorter advocated for the creation of the College Football Association and for the preservation of bowl games and amateurism. He negotiated the conference's lucrative television contracts for football and basketball as well as its host agreement with the Sugar Bowl. He also oversaw the revival of the SEC men's basketball tournament in 1979. During his tenure, the SEC's financial distribution per school rose from $2 million a year to $18 million. He retired in 1986 due to emphysema.

== Later life ==
After his term as commissioner ended, McWhorter returned to Georgia as an athletic and academic consultant to president Charles Boynton Knapp. He was responsible for tracking the academic progress of the university's student-athletes following an academic scandal. He died on July 23, 1994 at his home in Athens, Georgia from emphysema. He was buried in Oconee Hill Cemetery.
