= Skidaway Island State Park =

State park in Savannah, Georgia, US

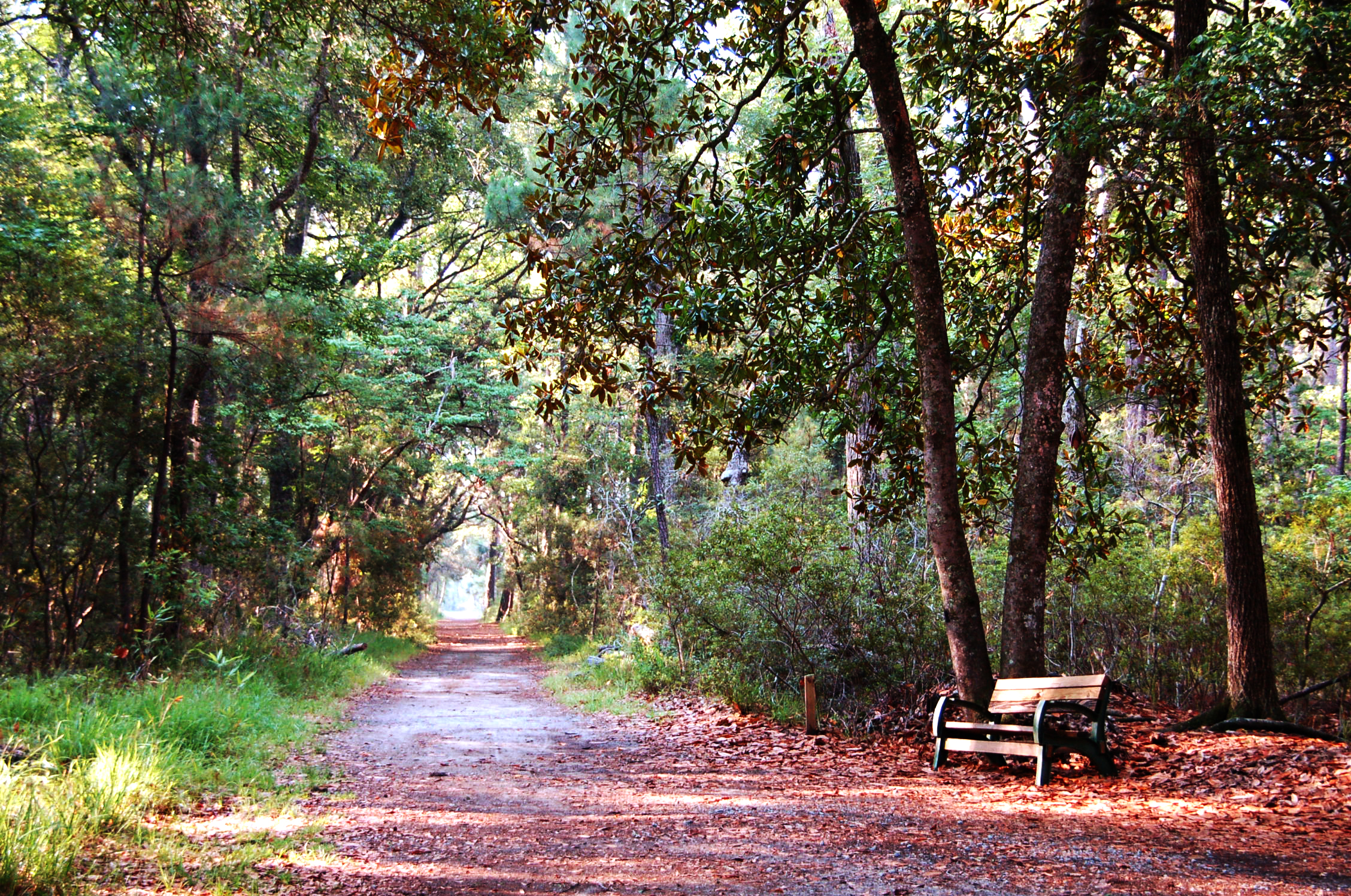
- Skidaway Island State Park, June 2011

- Location within Georgia Location within the United States
- Nearest city: Savannah, Georgia
- Coordinates: 31.955°N 81.053°W
- Area: 588 acres (2.38 km^{2})
- Established: June 1975
- Governing body: Georgia State Park

Skidaway Island State Park is a 588-acre (2.38 km^{2}) state park on Skidaway Island, Georgia. Located in Chatham County, Georgia approximately 8 miles southeast of Savannah, the park borders Skidaway narrows, which is part of Georgia’s intracoastal waterway. Trails wind through maritime forest and past salt marsh, leading to a boardwalk and observation tower. Visitors can watch for deer, fiddler crabs, raccoon, egrets and other wildlife. Inside the park’s interpretive center, birders will find binoculars, reference books and a window where they can look for migrating species such as Painted Buntings.

The park opened in June 1975 after years of discussion.

== Facilities ==
- 87 tent/trailer/RV sites
- 5 picnic shelters
- Group shelter
- 3 camper cabins
- 3 pioneer campgrounds
- Interpretive center
- 2 playgrounds
- 6 miles of hiking trails
