= Georgia Board of Regents =

Oversight body of the University System of Georgia, USA

Coordinates: 33.747434°N 84.390164°W

The Georgia Board of Regents oversees the University System of Georgia as part of the state government of Georgia in the United States. The University System of Georgia is composed of all state public institutions of higher education in the state. The Board of Regents also preside over the Georgia Public Library Service.

== History ==
The Board was organized on January 1, 1932, to create centralized control over all member institutions. The Board marked the first period that public institutions of higher education were governed and managed under a sole authority. The governor appoints members of the Board, each of whom serve seven years. Today the Board of Regents is composed of 19 members, five of whom are appointed from the state-at-large, and one from each of the state’s 14 congressional districts. The Board elects a chancellor who serves as its chief executive officer and the chief administrative officer of the University System.

== Governing authority ==
The Board oversees 26 institutions of higher education: four research universities, four comprehensive universities, 9 state universities, and 9 state colleges.

Public funding for member institutions is distributed by the Board. In fiscal year 2003, the Board dispensed $1,697,287,628 of funding, authorized by the Georgia General Assembly. In 2006, the budget grew to $5 billion.

== Organization ==
The Board consists of 19 voting members, serving seven-year terms. The Governor appoints, subject to Senate confirmation, one from each Congressional district and five at-large members.

The Board appoints a chief executive for the system, known as a chancellor. Former Georgia Governor and United States Secretary of Agriculture Sonny Perdue became the 14th Chancellor in 2022.

Previous chancellors include Charles Mercer Snelling (1932–1933), Steadman Vincent Sanford (1935-1945), Harmon White Caldwell (1948-1964), Erroll B. Davis Jr. (2006-2011), and Hank Huckaby (2011-2017).

Each individual institution has its own President and senior staff. The system of 26 colleges and universities includes the University of Georgia, the state's flagship land-grant, sea-grant, space-grant, and sun-grant research university, Fort Valley State University, a historically black land-grant university, Skidaway Institute of Oceanography, which specializes in coastal and marine environments and became part of the University of Georgia in 2013, the Georgia Institute of Technology, which has a strong emphasis in technology and engineering, Augusta University that includes the Medical College of Georgia, and the Georgia Public Library Service, which distributes state funding to 385 libraries in the state's 61 public library systems.

In 2024, Brian Kemp appointed David B. Dove, Dan Murphy, and Deep J. Shah to the board; Sarah-Elizabeth Langford and Jose R. Perez were appointed to the Georgia Board of Economic Development. Simultaneously, Smith was moved from an at-large district to the fifth district; Bradbury was moved from the eleventh to the sixth; and Evans from the sixth to the seventh.

Members of the Board (2024)	District
Dan Murphy	Thirteenth
Tom Bradbury	Sixth
Deep J. Shah	At-Large
W. Allen Gudenrath	Eighth
Erin Hames (Vice Chair)	At-Large
Samuel D. Holmes	At-Large
Bárbara Rivera Holmes	Second
C. Thomas Hopkins Jr.	Third
James M. Hull	At-Large
Cade Joiner	Fourth
Patrick C. Jones	First
C. Everett Kennedy III	Twelfth
David B. Dove	Eleventh
Lowery Houston May	Fourteenth
Richard T. Evans	Seventh
Neil L. Pruitt Jr.	At-Large
Harold Reynolds (Chair)	Tenth
T. Dallas Smith	Fifth
James K. Syfan III	Ninth

== See also ==
- University System of Georgia
- Student Advisory Council of Georgia
