= Wyatt Anderson =

American geneticist and evolutionary biologist

- Born: March 27, 1939; New Orleans, Louisiana, U.S.
- Died: November 11, 2023 (aged 84); Athens, Georgia, U.S.
- Education: Rockefeller University
- Known for: Drosophila research
- Spouse: Margaret Anderson
- Children: 3
- Awards: Member of the National Academy of Sciences since 1987
- Scientific career
- Fields: Evolutionary biology, genetics
- Institutions: University of Georgia
- Thesis: Studies on selection in natural and experimental populations of Drosophila pseudoobscura (1966)
- Academic advisors: Theodosius Dobzhansky

Wyatt Wheaton Anderson (March 27, 1939 - 11 November 2023) was an American geneticist and evolutionary biologist. He is Alumni Foundation Distinguished Professor Emeritus in the Department of Genetics in the University of Georgia's Franklin College of Arts and Sciences. He was also the dean of the Franklin College of Arts and Sciences from 1992 until he stepped down in 2004. He has been a member of the National Academy of Sciences since 1987, and is also a fellow of the American Academy of Arts and Sciences and the American Association for the Advancement of Science.

== Research ==
Anderson is known for his research on the evolutionary genetics of Drosophila. In 2012, for example, he co-authored a study with Patricia Adair Gowaty and Yong-Kyu Kim in which they attempted, and failed, to replicate a famous 1948 study by Angus John Bateman. Their results indicated that Bateman was wrong in his conclusions that male Drosophila melanogaster were promiscuous and females were more "choosy" with regard to their mating behaviors.

== Personal life ==
Anderson is married to Margaret Anderson, a statistician with whom he co-founded the Wyatt and Margaret Anderson Professorship in the Arts at UGA. The first recipient of this professorship was Frederick Burchinal in 2006. Together, they have 3 children and 4 grandchildren
