= Harmon White Caldwell =

President of the University of Georgia
- In office 1935–1948
- Preceded by: Steadman Vincent Sanford
- Succeeded by: Jonathan Clark Rogers

Personal details
- Born: January 29, 1899 Meriwether County, Georgia
- Died: April 15, 1977 (aged 78) Athens, Georgia
- Education: University of Georgia

Harmon White Caldwell (January 29, 1899 – April 15, 1977) was President of the University of Georgia (UGA) in Athens from 1935 until 1948 and Chancellor of the University System of Georgia from 1948 to 1964.

Caldwell was born in the Carmel Community of Meriwether County, Georgia, in 1899. He earned an A.B. from UGA in 1919 after only two years and was a member of Chi Phi fraternity and the Phi Kappa Literary Society. Upon graduation, he taught public school in both Sasser, Georgia and Taylorsville, Georgia. In 1921, Caldwell entered the Harvard Law School and graduated with the degree Bachelor of Law (LL.B.) in 1924. That same year he became a part-time assistant professor of law at Emory University in Atlanta, Georgia, in addition to practicing law at the firm of King, Caldwell and Partridge. Five years later, Caldwell assumed a professorship at the UGA School of Law. He returned to the law practice and part-time duties at Emory in 1932; however, he returned to UGA as the dean of the law school in 1933.

Caldwell's accomplishments as president include:

- Reorganization of the Graduate School in 1937
- Stewarding the purchase of the DeRenne Library of Georgianna, which formed the nucleus of the present day Department of Special Collections at University Libraries
- Creation of the University of Georgia Press
- The Navy preflight school
- A rise in attendance from 2,468 in the fall of 1945 to 6,643 in the fall of 1946

The following buildings were opened during Caldwell's presidential tenure:

- Mary Lyndon Hall (1936)
- Four Towers (1937)
- Hoke Smith Building (1937)
- Clark Howell Hall (1937)
- Forestry Resources Building (1938)
- Baldwin Hall (1938)
- LeConte Hall (1938)
- Park Hall (1938)
- Rutherford Hall (1939)
- Dairy Science Building (1939)
- Snelling Hall (1940)
- McPhaul Child and Family Development Center (1940)
- Payne Hall (1940)
- Founders' Memorial Garden (1941)
- Fine Arts Building (1941)
- Alumni House (1943)
- Stegeman Hall (1943).

Caldwell also served as a trustee of the Berry Schools and Callaway Gardens in Georgia.

== Desegregation ==
In 1961, during Caldwell's tenure the University of Georgia was forcibly desegregated. While Black applicants were told there was no campus accommodation available for them, an internal communication from Caldwell indicated that the university was "relying on this to bar the admission of a Negro girl from Atlanta."

== Death ==
In 1977, Caldwell died in Atlanta, Georgia. Caldwell Hall, home to the University of Georgia's School of Environment and Design, is named in his honor, as well as the Harmon W. Caldwell Professorship in Constitutional Law in the UGA Law School.

Preceded by Steadman Vincent Sanford	President of the University of Georgia; 1935 – 1948	Succeeded by Jonathan Clark Rogers
