= Skidaway Island, Georgia =

- Unincorporated community Census-designated place
- Skidaway Island State Park

- Location in Chatham County and the state of Georgia
- Coordinates: 31°55′39″N 81°2′33″W
- Country: United States
- State: Georgia
- County: Chatham

Area
  - Total: 17.86 sq mi (46.26 km^{2})
  - Land: 16.49 sq mi (42.71 km^{2})
  - Water: 1.37 sq mi (3.55 km^{2})
- Elevation: 10 ft (3.0 m)

Population (2020)
  - Total: 9,310
  - Density: 564.5/sq mi (217.97/km^{2})
- Time zone: UTC-5 (Eastern (EST))
  - Summer (DST): UTC-4 (EDT)
- FIPS code: 13-71184
- GNIS feature ID: 1867245

Skidaway Island is an unincorporated community and census-designated place (CDP) (Note: For statistical purposes, the U.S. Census Bureau defines Skidaway Island as a census-designated place (CDP).) in Chatham County, Georgia, and lies on a barrier island of the same name. Located south of Savannah, Skidaway Island is known for its waterfront properties and golf courses within The Landings, one of the largest gated communities in the country. The population was 9,310 at the 2020 census. A separate area of the island hosts the Skidaway Institute of Oceanography, a research institution operated by the University of Georgia. It receives scholars and researchers from several other Georgia universities as well, including Georgia Tech, Savannah State University, and the College of Coastal Georgia. Skidaway Island is part of the Savannah Metropolitan Statistical Area.

== Name ==
It is uncertain why the name "Skidaway" was applied to this island. The name may relate to one in Yamacraw or another Native American Creek language. In his 1967 publication How Georgia Got Her Names, Hal E. Brinkley speculated it might be an Anglicized form of Scenawki, wife of the local Yamacraw chief Tomochichi and for whom Georgia's founder James Oglethorpe named the island.

== History ==
Several archaeological sites on Skidaway Island have been identified as possible shell rings, circular or semi-circular mounds constructed by the indigenous inhabitants of the island, including:

- Skidaway (Archaeological site number 9CH77),
- Skidaway 9, Large and Small (Archaeological site number 9CH73),
- Skidaway 21 (Archaeological site number 9CH75), and
- Odingsell (Archaeological site number 9CH111).

None of the mounds have been excavated by archaeologists.

Before the American Civil War, planters farmed on the island using enslaved labor. On January 15, 1865, during the final year of the conflict, U.S. General William T. Sherman issued Special Field Order, No. 15 (series 1865). The order reallocated plantation lands on "Skidmore Island" to some formerly enslaved people whom Sherman had freed pursuant to the Emancipation Proclamation. The former slaves received plots of land no larger than 40 acres (16 ha). Land records show that many such plots were issued on the island beginning on April 11, 1865, two days after C.S.A. General Robert E. Lee surrendered his Army of Northern Virginia at Appomattox Court House; plots were issued though that summer and early fall, despite the death of President Abraham Lincoln, and before Georgia's readmission to the Union and the resumption of civil authority there. Lincoln's successor, President Andrew Johnson, opposed such land transfers, as would various courts, especially since no legislation supported it. During the Reconstruction era, federal and state policy emphasized wage labor, not land ownership, for black people. Almost all land allocated to blacks in 1865 was ultimately restored to its original white owners.

In a March 2019 referendum, Skidaway Island voters overwhelmingly rejected a bill that would have incorporated their community as the City of Skidaway Island. The island remains unincorporated.

== Geography ==
Skidaway Island is located at 31°55′39″N 81°2′33″W (31.927434, -81.042505).

According to the United States Census Bureau, the CDP has a total area of 17.9 square miles (46 km^{2}), of which 16.4 square miles (42 km^{2}) is land and 1.5 square miles (3.9 km^{2}) (8.45%) is water.

== Demographics ==
Historical population
Census	Pop.	Note	%±
1980	1,264		—
1990	4,495		255.6%
2000	6,914		53.8%
2010	8,341		20.6%
2020	9,310		11.6%
U.S. Decennial Census; 1850-1870 1870-1880; 1890-1910 1920-1930; 1940 1950 1960; 1970 1980 1990; 2000 2010 2020

Skidaway Island has been listed as a census-designated place (CDP) since the 1980 United States census.

=== Racial and ethnic composition ===
Skidaway Island, Georgia – Racial and ethnic composition Note: the US Census treats Hispanic/Latino as an ethnic category. This table excludes Latinos from the racial categories and assigns them to a separate category. Hispanics/Latinos may be of any race.
Race / Ethnicity (NH = Non-Hispanic)	Pop. 2000	Pop. 2010	Pop. 2020	% 2000	% 2010	% 2020
White alone (NH)	6,703	7,954	8,605	96.95%	95.36%	92.43%
Black or African American alone (NH)	33	65	97	0.48%	0.78%	1.04%
Native American or Alaska Native alone (NH)	1	7	0	0.01%	0.08%	0.00%
Asian alone (NH)	95	154	184	1.37%	1.85%	1.98%
Pacific Islander alone (NH)	0	3	0	0.00%	0.04%	0.00%
Other race alone (NH)	3	13	24	0.04%	0.16%	0.26%
Mixed race or Multiracial (NH)	26	33	193	0.38%	0.40%	2.07%
Hispanic or Latino (any race)	53	112	207	0.77%	1.34%	2.22%
Total	6,914	8,341	9,310	100.00%	100.00%	100.00%

=== 2020 census ===
As of the 2020 census, Skidaway Island had a population of 9,310 and 3,014 families residing in the CDP.

The median age was 64.3 years. 14.6% of residents were under the age of 18 and 48.8% of residents were 65 years of age or older. For every 100 females there were 90.3 males, and for every 100 females age 18 and over there were 86.5 males age 18 and over.

82.7% of residents lived in urban areas, while 17.3% lived in rural areas.

There were 4,173 households in Skidaway Island, of which 17.4% had children under the age of 18 living in them. Of all households, 72.5% were married-couple households, 6.7% were households with a male householder and no spouse or partner present, and 19.0% were households with a female householder and no spouse or partner present. About 21.1% of all households were made up of individuals and 17.7% had someone living alone who was 65 years of age or older.

There were 4,511 housing units, of which 7.5% were vacant. The homeowner vacancy rate was 1.5% and the rental vacancy rate was 10.7%.

== Notable people ==
- Dorothea Orem, nursing theorist, who died at her home on Skidaway Island on June 22, 2007.
- Ron Senkowski, founder of Farmer's Almanac TV.
- Bobby Thomson, baseball player, who died at his home there on August 16, 2010.

== See also ==
- Skidaway Island State Park
