= Charles Mercer Snelling =

American academic (1862–1939)

President of the University of Georgia
- In office 1925–1932
- Preceded by: David Crenshaw Barrow Jr.
- Succeeded by: Steadman Vincent Sanford

Personal details
- Born: November 3, 1862 Richmond, Virginia
- Died: September 19, 1939 (aged 76) Athens, Georgia
- Education: Virginia Military Institute, Georgia Military Institute

Charles Mercer Snelling (November 3, 1862 – September 19, 1939) was the chancellor of the University of Georgia (UGA) in Athens, Georgia, from 1925 to 1932 and the first chancellor of the Georgia Board of Regents of the University System of Georgia (1932–1933). All UGA leaders after Snelling have been referred to as president (the previous title before the 1860 University reorganization that created the UGA Chancellor position).

== Biography ==
Snelling was born in Richmond, Virginia, and graduated from the Virginia Military Institute in 1884. He taught mathematics there when he graduated, then at the Georgia Military Institute in 1885–1886, as well as a 2-year stint teaching at South Georgia College in Thomasville. Snelling came to the university in 1888 as an adjunct professor of mathematics and commandant of cadets. He became a professor in 1897, and dean of the university in 1909.

== Accomplishments ==
Accomplishments of Snelling as the UGA Chancellor include:

- Forming the Bureau of Business Research in 1929
- Established the Institute of Public Affairs (1927)
- Reorganized the Lumpkin Law School
- Hired Ms. J.H. Bryan as the first female faculty member (Journalism, 1928)
- The Department of Music and Fine Arts was organized in 1926 under Hugh Hodgson
- Formed the division of General Extension to oversee adult education
- Oversaw completion of various buildings [Women's P.E. Building (1928); Brooks Hall (1928); Sanford Stadium (1929); Military Science Building (1931); Hirsch Hall (Law School, 1932)]

After Snelling's tenure as the university system chancellor, he became director of adult education for the state, a post he held until his death on September 19, 1939, in Athens. The Snelling Dining Commons is a south campus facility named in his honor.

Academic offices
Preceded by David Crenshaw Barrow Jr.	President of the University of Georgia; 1925–1932	Succeeded by Steadman Vincent Sanford
