= WGHR (Georgia) =

Radio station in Marietta, Georgia (1981–2004)

- Marietta, Georgia; United States
- Broadcast area: Cobb County, Georgia (former FM)

Programming
- Format: Defunct (was college radio)
- Affiliations: WRN Broadcast (1996–2000)

Ownership
- Owner: Southern Polytechnic State University

History
- First air date: 1969 (CC AM), 1981 (FM)
- Last air date: 2004
- Former call signs: "WSTB" (unofficial)
- Former frequencies: 102.5, 100.7, 101.1MHz, 1280 kHz
- Call sign meaning: "Green Hornet Radio"

Technical information
- Facility ID: 61370
- Class: D
- ERP: 17W
- HAAT: 47 m (154 ft)
- Transmitter coordinates: 33°56′22″N 84°31′12″W

WGHR was a noncommercial radio station operated exclusively by the students of Southern Polytechnic State University in Marietta, Georgia, United States. The station was supported by students and its listeners to provide diverse programming and represent its community with a wide variety of musical genres.

== History ==
Like many other college radio stations, WGHR began as a carrier current low-power AM station in 1969, transmitting on 1280 kHz from a wire loop antenna situated atop the circle of buildings at the center of the campus. Although it was not an officially assigned callsign, it adopted the name WSTB, an acronym for Southern Tech Broadcasting. Nicknamed "Stubby", its studio was located in a dormitory.

In the mid-1970s, the station applied for a low-power FM station, initially trying 91.7. However, this application was rejected for being too close to 91.9 (WCLK) and 91.1 (WREK). Ultimately, the station decided on 102.5 and eventually received a construction permit for this frequency in 1979. Since there was already a WSTB FM station in Streetsboro, Ohio, the students selected WGHR to mean "Green Hornet Radio", after the school's mascot. The station's nickname was later changed to "Wooger" (mocked by the station's own promos later on). After a one-year delay (due to a recalled Harris Broadcast transmitter), it began broadcasting FM in 1981, serving most of the Cobb County area in the northwestern metro Atlanta region.

At that time, it shared an office in the student center with The Sting, the student newspaper. In 1993, the expansion and renovation of the building were completed, and it moved from the old office to its own studio. Despite the increased building size, the size of the new station was halved, which was seen by many as a sign of how the station was viewed by the administration. The new facility did, however, include a restroom and a large window into the atrium at the main entrance, which allowed students and visitors to see into the broadcast studio. This is still the station's current facility.

== Programming ==
Not much is known about what the station broadcast when AM was the predominant method of radio transmission. When it went to FM, the first song it played was Barry Manilow's "Looks Like We Made It", and it continued playing top 40. It gradually moved towards a "college rock" format during the 1980s, and diversified during the early 1990s, which it has continued since.

In 1996, after a DJ went to Canada and heard CBC Radio running the World Radio Network overnight instead of going off-air, the amateur radio club helped revive the satellite dish atop the building. The station then started broadcasting international news from WRN at night, on weekends, and during breaks. SPSU students created a broadcast automation system to manage the station when operators were not present.

== License ==
WGHR's 17-watt ERP class D (low-power) FM signal was later forced from the air by a sequence of events related to FCC rulings, and the evolution of the commercial band in metro Atlanta.

When WGHR first applied, FM class D stations were considered equal to other full-power stations. That changed in 1980, when the National Association of Broadcasters (representing only large commercial stations), the then-new National Public Radio, and even the Corporation for Public Broadcasting convinced the FCC to demote class D stations to a second-class status, and to stop issuing new class D licenses altogether. The exception was for NPR and NAB-member stations, who could continue building new broadcast translators (also class D) however they liked. While the discrimination against technically identical stations just for originating their own programming seems appalling and unconstitutional to many, these small stations have never had the resources to challenge this in court.

Because of the ruling, WGHR (among many) was left completely vulnerable to any full-power station that wanted its spot on the dial. FCC docket 80-90, introduced in 1980, allowed full-power stations to move in or fill in closer together, forcing many class Ds off the air with no other place to go.

In the Atlanta area, two new docket 80–90 allotments were proposed in the early 1980s, one north of Atlanta on 107.5, and one west-northwest on 102.5: WGHR's exact frequency. Five proposals were submitted to the FCC for the latter: one for Forest Park, one for Douglasville, one for Lithia Springs, one for Mableton, and finally WGHR's for Marietta, reserved as non-commercial educational (NCE). At the time, the FCC had no rules to level the playing field for NCE stations, so WGHR lost out. The remaining proposals floated around until 1988, when Mableton was selected, and the new allotment was opened for applications. Those applicants battled it out in court for years, until one was finally selected in the mid-1990s.

The allotment of a new class A station at 102.5 MHz in Mableton prompted WGHR to move from that frequency to 100.7 MHz in 1998. When WWWQ (now WNNX) began broadcasting on 100.5 MHz in Atlanta, WGHR moved back to 102.5 temporarily to avoid receiving and causing interference, and an application was filed with the FCC to move to 101.1 MHz. Shortly afterward however, the full-power station WAMJ (now WPZE) began broadcasting, and WGHR was again forced to move. Because they were still licensed for 100.7 MHz, WGHR resumed broadcasting there. The owners of 100.5 (Susquehanna Radio Corporation) strongly objected to this, and consequently, WGHR ceased over-the-air broadcasts in order to avoid trouble with the FCC.

In January 2004, after being unable to broadcast for 12 consecutive months, the FM license for WGHR was automatically canceled by the FCC as required by Congress, and the application to move to 101.1 was dismissed as moot. It continued to webcast, in hopes that the LPFM rules will later be relaxed, allowing it to return to the airwaves.

Southern Polytechnic State University was merged into Kennesaw State University in 2013. WGHR was then dissolved in favor of Owl Radio, the online-only student radio station at KSU.
