= Student Advisory Council =

Student Advisory Council to the Board of Regents of the University System of Georgia
- Creating a More Educated Georgia
- Abbreviation: SAC
- Formation: 1968
- Type: Advisory Board
- Purpose: To advise the Board of Regents and Chancellor
- Headquarters: Atlanta, Georgia
- Region served: State-Wide
- Members: 25 Student Government Association Presidents
- Chancellor: Sonny Perdue
- Parent organization: Georgia Board of Regents
- Website: https://www.usg.edu/student-affairs/sac/

The Student Advisory Council to the Georgia Board of Regents of the University System of Georgia (USG) is composed of 25 student representatives each from the 25 public colleges and universities in the University System of Georgia. The organization acts as an advisory board to the Board of Regents, through the Chancellor, on issues that are important to students.

== Membership ==
Representatives on the Student Advisory Council are required to be current and active students within the university system. Each president of the 25 public institutions' student governments are automatically appointed as representatives upon their election at their institution, yet may assign another current member of their respective association to represent their institution on their behalf. Furthermore, an additional nine members represent several satellite campuses of other universities. This change occurred after a series of consolidations between 2011 and 2018 which reduced the number of colleges and universities from 35 to 25. The list of current representatives on the Student Advisory Council can be found on the Student Advisory Council's website.

USG Institutions	SAC Executives (Spring 2026)
Abraham Baldwin Agricultural College	Jenna Williams
Albany State University	Jonathan Bing
Atlanta Metropolitan State College	Alexandria Powers
Augusta University	John Blalock
Clayton State University	Amiah Pierre
College of Coastal Georgia	Logan Zimmerman
Columbus State University	Undrell Walker
Dalton State College	Ethan Owens
Fort Valley State University	Duane Patrick, Jr.
Georgia College & State University	Serene Semere
Georgia Gwinnett College	Coreon Johnson
Georgia Highlands College	Josephine Tolsma
Georgia Institute of Technology	Sultan Ziyad
Georgia Southern University	Jya Ewing
Georgia Southwestern State University	Nakayla Kennedy
Georgia State University	James Wilson
Gordon State College	Mahki Stephens
Kennesaw State University	Allisa George
Middle Georgia State University	Ca'Shun Barr
Savannah State University	Zaylen Gates
South Georgia State College	Lauren Rollings
University of Georgia	John Neely
University of North Georgia	Emma Mitchell
University of West Georgia	Zachary Potter
Valdosta State University	Kai Kemp

== History ==
On March 13, 1968, Chancellor George L. Simpson, Jr. recommended that the Board of Regents establish a University System Student Advisory Council. This council was to be composed of all the student body presidents within the University System.

The Board of Regents felt that the format of the Student Advisory Council would further enhance the student government organizations while creating responsible student leadership in the University System and so authorized its establishment.

=== Georgia constitution mandate ===
- Provide a forum for communication and recommendation between the students of the University System of Georgia and the Chancellor of the System, the Board of Regents, the state government, the news media, and the public concerning problems and issues which are important to the students of the University System of Georgia.
- Promote better student government at institutions of the University System through the dissemination of information between and the provision of assistance to member institutions regarding problems and activities. The primary internal function of the Student Advisory Council shall be to discuss issues of direct concern to the student body of the University System of Georgia within those forums established for that purpose.

== Meetings ==
The Student Advisory Council meets one or two times per semester to present committee progress and to openly discuss ongoing and new issues. Presentations are also performed to SAC by USG personnel on such matters as Legislative updates, the USG Strategic Plan, and other changes that effect the student population in the University System. Other guests and participants include the Chancellor, Regents, the "host" institution's President, and faculty/staff from the various institutions. For each meeting, the student body presidents (SAC representatives) convene at different colleges/universities throughout the state. The "host" institution is predetermined, and is featured at the specific meeting as a means to diversify awareness of the different institutions within the University System.

== Committees ==
The student body presidents are assigned to committees on various relevant topics pertaining to students in the University System. Such topics are:

- An effort to create and mature the overall education of current students and to set goals to increase the graduation rates for each institution.
- An effort to define new means of available financial aid for students, and to repair any flaws with current means.
- An effort to clearly outline paths for students to transfer into different institutions.
- An effort to move the operations of each institution towards a "greener" campus.
- An effort to inform the students in the USG as a whole on SAC progress, and to create a common communication outlet for the SAC members.
- An effort to change the State's constitution to establish a student on the Board of Regents with full voting rights.

== See also ==
- Georgia Board of Regents
- Massachusetts State Student Advisory Council
- Student Government President
- University System of Georgia
