= Skidaway Institute of Oceanography =

UGA Skidway Institute of Oceanography
- Former name: Skidaway Institute of Oceanography
- Type: Research and Teaching Institution
- Established: 1968
- Affiliations: University of Georgia
- Director: Clark Alexander
- Location: Skidaway Island, Georgia, United States; 31.988548°N 81.021223°W
- Campus: 700 acres (2.8 km^{2}), coastal setting
- Website: www.skio.uga.edu

The University of Georgia Skidaway Institute of Oceanography (SkIO) is a marine science research and education institute located on Skidaway Island near Savannah, Georgia, USA. UGA Skidaway Institute faculty conduct oceanographic research across all the major marine science disciplines, and from the waters and marshes adjoining the campus to around the world. They teach, advise and mentor both undergraduate and graduate students on the UGA Skidaway Marine Science Campus and on the university’s main campus in Athens. Institute resources include state-of-the-art research laboratories and instrumentation, and the 92-foot research vessel Savannah.

== Setting and history ==
Located at the north end of Skidaway Island, the UGA Skidaway Marine Science Campus consists of 700 acres of forest and meadows, of which only a small portion is developed. The campus is surrounded by coastal estuaries and salt marshes which frequently play a role in UGA Skidaway Institute research.

In 1967, Robert and Dorothy Roebling donated their cattle plantation to the State of Georgia to establish a marine research facility. In addition, the Union Camp Corporation also donated 635 acres, including 300 acres of high land with access to the Wilmington River at the eastern side of the island. This portion of the campus is now called Priest Landing.

With the land donations, the Georgia General Assembly created the Ocean Science Center of the Atlantic (OSCA) in 1967. The Skidaway Institute of Oceanography was officially created as part of OSCA in January 1968 with Thomas Jackson (formerly of Georgia Tech) as director, two co-directors, a secretary and several former workers inherited from the Roebling farm. Its first faculty member, Herbert L. Windom, began work in July 1968. President Richard Nixon and Governor Lester Maddox dedicated the first building of the program in 1970. Governor Jimmy Carter dissolved OSCA in 1972, at which point Skidaway Institute became an independent research unit in the University System of Georgia.

In 2013, the institute was merged into the University of Georgia.

== Research ==
UGA Skidaway Institute scientists conduct oceanographic research across all the major disciplines (chemistry, biology, physics and geology. Their work extends from Georgia’s coastal estuaries to the deep ocean and around the globe, from the Antarctic to the Arctic.

Some recent UGA Skidaway Institute research includes:

- Examining the extent and nature of microplastic pollution in Georgia’s coastal waters.
- Investigating black gill in shrimp which is devastating the shrimping industry
- Studying how chemicals in atmospheric dust affects the rapid climate change in the Arctic
- Using underwater gliders to improve hurricane prediction models.
- Monitoring the erosion and accretion of sand dunes on Tybee Island with drone technology.
- Studying ocean color with nanosatellites

== Education ==
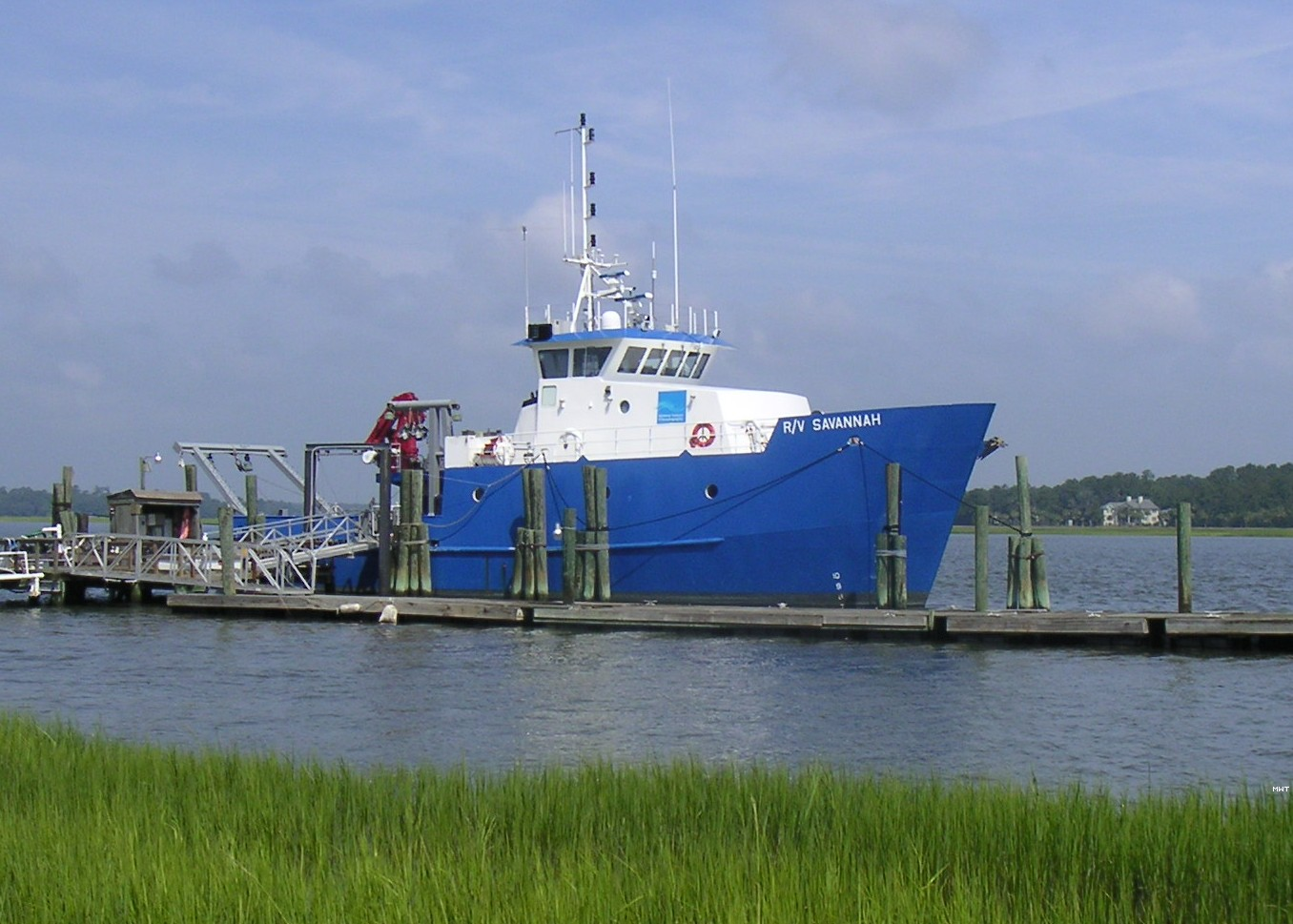
The R/V Savannah research vessel at the Skidaway Institute of Oceanography

Skidaway Institute’s education mission is primarily research-focused. Graduate students at both the masters and doctoral level come to Skidaway to work with the institute’s faculty. Some are enrolled at UGA, but others come from other institutions around the country and internationally. Advanced undergraduate students in marine sciences receive hands-on experience in Skidaway’s active internship program.

In the fall of 2021, UGA initiated an undergraduate major in ocean science. UGA Skidaway Institute faculty teach courses in this major via a sophisticated distance-learning system.

== Facilities ==
Skidaway Institute includes state-of-the-art biological, chemical, geological and physical oceanographic research laboratories as well as a number of specialized facilities:

- The 104-foot Research Vessel Savannah. A part of the University National Oceanographic Laboratory System fleet, the R/V Savannah is a modern, state-of-the-art vessel ideal for marine research in estuarine and continental shelf waters throughout the southeastern U.S. Atlantic and Gulf Coasts. The R/V Savannah can accommodate up to 16 research personnel for 24-hour “round the clock” research cruises or larger groups for shorter day-trips.
- A fleet of small boats for estuarine and coastal ocean field work.
- Instrumentation for chemical analysis of trace inorganic and organic constituents, and clean labs for sample preparation.
- Instruments to analyze the genetic identity, diversity and functionality of marine organisms and microbial communities. Sophisticated image analysis systems for studying microorganisms and plankton in the lab and in the field.
- Bathymetric sonar, aerial drones and autonomous underwater vehicles for field studies.

In October 2019, UGA Skidaway Institute completed the renovation and repurposing of the Roebling cattle barn into the Ocean Sciences Instructional Center, containing two state-of-the-art distance teaching classrooms and a dedicated hands-on teaching laboratory.

== Footnotes and References ==
1. "Skidaway Institute of Oceanography". New Georgia Encyclopedia. Retrieved 2022-02-04.
2. "Skidaway Institute of Oceanography - University of Georgia - Savannah, GA". Skidaway Institute of Oceanography. Retrieved 2022-02-04.
3. Kelly, V.E. (1994). A Short History of Skidaway Island. V.E. Kelly and The Branigar Organization Inc. pp. 101–105.
4. "Skidaway-UGA Merger Complete". Georgia Public Broadcasting. Retrieved 2022-02-04.
5. "UGA researchers, volunteers help push forward microplastics research". The Red and Black. Retrieved 2022-02-04.
6. The Current; 2021 (2021-09-14). "Research connects black gill in shrimp to warming climate". The Current. Retrieved 2022-02-04
7. "Isolated From The Coronavirus — And The Rest Of The World — On An Arctic Expedition". WABE. 2020-04-29. Retrieved 2022-02-04.
8. "UGA Skidaway Institute of Oceanography assists in improving hurricane forecast models". https://www.wtoc.com. Retrieved 2022-02-04
9. "UGA Skidaway Institute uses drones to study dune system performance". WSAV-TV. 2020-12-04. Retrieved 2022-02-04.
10. "University of Georgia Skidaway Institute of Oceanography assists in nanosatellite research", WTOC-TV 2021-07-20 retrieved 2022-02-04
11. "Graduate Study". Skidaway Institute of Oceanography. Retrieved 2022-02-04.
12. "Undergraduate Students | Marine Sciences & Oceanography at University of Georgia - Athens, Georgia". www.marsci.uga.edu. Retrieved 2022-02-04.
13. "Skidaway Institute of Oceanography". New Georgia Encyclopedia. Retrieved 2022-02-04.
14. "Stable Isotope Laboratory". Skidaway Institute of Oceanography. Retrieved 2022-02-04.
15. Landers, Mary. "Automated microscopes aid crucial ocean work at Skidaway". Savannah Morning News. Retrieved 2022-02-04.
16. "Cattle barn transformed to classrooms". Savannah Morning News. Retrieved 2022-02-04.

Specific
