= University System of Georgia =

Public university system in Georgia, United States

- Abbreviation: USG
- Formation: 1931
- Purpose: Educational oversight
- Headquarters: Atlanta, Georgia, United States
- Members: 25 public colleges and universities
- Chancellor: Thomas A. Fanning
- Students: 344,392
- Website: usg.edu

University System of Georgia Locations.
Black: Research Universities; Red: Regional Comprehensive Universities; Yellow: State Universities; Green: State Colleges.

The University System of Georgia (USG) is the government agency that includes 25 public institutions of higher learning in the U.S. state of Georgia. The system is governed by the Georgia Board of Regents. It sets goals and dictates general policy to educational institutions as well as administering the Public Library Service of the state which includes 58 public library systems. The USG also dispenses public funds (allocated by the state's legislature) to the institutions but not the lottery-funded HOPE Scholarship. The USG is the sixth largest university system in the United States by total student enrollment, with 344,392 students in 26 public institutions as of 2023. USG institutions are divided into four categories: research universities, regional comprehensive universities, state universities, and state colleges.

The system designates four institutions as "research universities": Georgia Institute of Technology, University of Georgia, Augusta University, and Georgia State University. (Note: While other USG institutions may be categorized as "research universities" by the Carnegie Classification or other rankings, USG's internal classification system includes only these four under that label.) The University of Georgia is the state and system's flagship university, the state's oldest institution of higher learning, and one of the state's two land-grant universities. After its 2016 merger with Georgia Perimeter College, Georgia State University became the largest institution of higher learning in the USG until 2024, with over 50,000 students. University of North Georgia is the state's designated military school. There are three historically black schools housed within the USG: Savannah State University, Albany State University, and the state's second land-grant university, Fort Valley State University.

In 2012, all USG institutions combined had a $14.1 billion economic impact on the state of Georgia. Georgia Tech in Atlanta and University of Georgia in nearby Athens had the largest impacts on their regional economies: $2.6 billion and 20,869 jobs at Georgia Tech and $2.2 billion and 22,196 jobs at the University of Georgia. Georgia State University's central campus in Atlanta had a $1.6 billion economic impact with 13,736 jobs; given its merger with Perimeter College, with an economic impact of $600 million, Georgia State's overall economic impact on the Atlanta metro area is $2.2 billion.

== History ==
=== Early years ===
The University System of Georgia was created with the passage of the Reorganization Act of 1931 by the Georgia General Assembly in 1931. The act created a board of regents to oversee the state's colleges and universities and the 26 boards of trustees that had provided oversight over the institutions before passage of the act. The board of regents officially took office on January 1, 1932, and consisted of eleven members to be appointed by the Governor of Georgia pending approval from the Georgia Senate. The governor held an ex officio position on the board. The regents were to elect a chairman and select a secretary. One regent was appointed from each of Georgia's ten congressional districts and the eleventh member was chosen at large.

Governor Richard Russell Jr.'s initial appointees included Cason Jewell Callaway Sr., Martha Berry, Richard Russell Sr. (the governor's father), George C. Woodruff, William Dickson Anderson Sr. (1873–1957), Egbert Erle Cocke Sr. (1895–1977) and Philip Robert Weltner Sr. (1887–1981). Anderson was elected chairman, Weltner vice-chairman and Cocke was appointed as the secretary/treasurer. Prior to the Reorganization Act, Georgia university chief executives held the title of chancellor; however, after the Act, university heads were given the title of president and a new chancellor position was created. The USG chancellor was selected and overseen by the board. At the request of the regents, Charles Snelling, the presiding head of the University of Georgia (UGA), stepped down from his position at UGA to become the initial chancellor of the entire system.

The 1932 annual report for the board stated outstanding debts of $1,074,415. Over the next few years, the USG endeavored to transform the state's institutions of higher learning by reorganizing schools, merging and closing others and transforming course offerings and curriculum.

=== Modern history ===
In 2011, Chancellor Hank Huckaby recommended four consolidations among eight institutions, which would be implemented in 2013. The same year, the board of regents adopted six "Principles for Consolidation", which has led to multiple consolidations in the subsequent years. As of 2026, these consolidations decreased the number of USG colleges and universities from 35 to 25.

In Fall 2018, the university system saw enrollment reach an all-time high of 328,712 students enrolled across the system's 26 colleges and universities.

On March 6, 2019, an Atlanta court upheld a USG policy barring unauthorized immigrants from attending Georgia State, Georgia Tech, and the University of Georgia.

In regards to the COVID-19 pandemic in the United States, the USG decided against making wearing face coverings mandatory for the fall 2020 semester before deciding to mandate them.

On April 1, 2022, former Georgia governor and United States Secretary of Agriculture Sonny Perdue became the system's 14th chancellor. That same month, the system was censured by the American Association of University Professors over changes to tenure protections.

== Georgia Research Alliance ==
The Georgia Research Alliance is an Atlanta, Georgia-based nonprofit organization that coordinates research efforts between Georgia's public and private sectors. While GRA receives a state appropriation for investment in university-based research opportunities, its operations are funded through foundation and industry contributions. In its first 19 years, GRA leveraged $525 million in state funding into $2.6 billion of additional federal and private investment.

In 2007, GRA coalesced the strengths of several universities into a focused research effort built around new types of vaccines and therapeutics.

GRA Eminent Scholars

GRA Eminent Scholars are top scientists from around the world recruited by the Georgia Research Alliance. For each scholar, GRA invests $750,000 for an endowment, an amount that the research university matches in private funds on a minimum 1-1 basis. Eminent Scholars often bring a research team, significant federal funding and private support for their research. Georgia's investment in GRA Eminent Scholars has yielded more than $1 billion in outside grants and contracts for the state and helped to launch some 35 companies.

GRA's Cancer Initiative

Georgia Cancer Coalition logo

After 10 years as an independent nonprofit organization, the Georgia Cancer Coalition became an initiative of the Georgia Research Alliance on January 18, 2012. The move was part of a larger effort to align Georgia's economic development assets in a more effective way.

GRA VentureLab

The Georgia Research Alliance set out to help launch companies around Georgian university research results, GRA launched its lead commercialization program, VentureLab, in 2002.

GRA also works with established Georgia companies through the Georgia Department of Economic Development and the Georgia Centers of Innovation in aerospace, logistics, life sciences, energy, agriculture and advanced manufacturing. The COIs help find technology solutions to industry challenges, in part by connecting companies to leading-edge research at Georgia's universities.

From 2002 to 2010, GRA directed $19 million of state funding into VentureLab. During that time, more than 700 university inventions or discoveries have been evaluated for commercial potential. More than 107 active companies have been formed, which employ more than 650 Georgians. These companies have also attracted $460 million in equity investment and generated $77 million in revenue.

GRA Centers of Research Excellence

Centers of Research Excellence are collaborative and individual efforts that focus on one area of scientific research.

== List of institutions ==
Institution	Main Campus Location	Founded	USG designation	President	Enrollment (Fall 2026)	Budget (FY 2027)	Campus size as of 2012 (main campus only)	Athletics
Augusta University (AU)	Augusta	1828	Research University, Medical College	Russell T. Keen	12,788	$1,109,766,80	485 acres (1.96 km^{2})	Peach Belt (NCAA Division II)
Georgia Institute of Technology (Georgia Tech or GT)	Atlanta	1885	Research University	Ángel Cabrera	58,264	$2,342,318,416	400 acres (1.6 km^{2})	ACC (NCAA Division I)
Georgia State University (GSU)	Atlanta	1913	Research University	M. Brian Blake	54,270	$1,249,809,252	518 acres (2.10 km^{2})	Sun Belt (NCAA Division I)
University of Georgia (UGA)	Athens	1785	Research University, Flagship University	Jere W. Morehead	44,547	$2,075,849,581	759 acres (3.07 km^{2})	SEC (NCAA Division I)
Georgia Southern University (GS)	Statesboro	1906	Regional Comprehensive University	Kyle L. Marrero	33,462	$598,316,552	700 acres (2.8 km^{2})	Sun Belt (NCAA Division I) (Note: The East Georgia Campus operates a freestanding NAIA athletics program in the Continental Athletic Conference.)
Kennesaw State University (KSU)	Kennesaw	1963	Regional Comprehensive University	Kathy "Kat" Schwaig	51,260	$946,954,559	384 acres (1.55 km^{2})	CUSA (NCAA Division I)
University of West Georgia (UWG)	Carrollton	1906	Regional Comprehensive University	Michael Johnson	16,977	$302,008,007	645 acres (2.61 km^{2})	UAC (NCAA Division I)
Valdosta State University (VSU)	Valdosta	1906	Regional Comprehensive University	William R. Crowe (Interim)	10,998	$212,178,331	168 acres (0.68 km^{2})	Gulf South (NCAA Division II)
Albany State University (ASU)	Albany	1903	State University, HBCU	Robert Scott	6,832	$185,720,754	232 acres (0.94 km^{2})	SIAC (NCAA Division II)
Clayton State University (CSU)	Morrow	1969	State University	Georj Lewis	6,626	$99,928,220	163 acres (0.66 km^{2})	Peach Belt (NCAA Division II)
Columbus State University (CSU)	Columbus	1958	State University	Stuart Rayfield	7,536	$157,136,603	132 acres (0.53 km^{2})	Peach Belt (NCAA Division II)
Fort Valley State University (FVSU)	Fort Valley	1895	State University, HBCU	Paul Jones	3,316	$154,134,673	630 acres (2.5 km^{2})	SIAC (NCAA Division II)
Georgia College & State University (GCSU or Georgia College)	Milledgeville	1889	State University	Cathy Cox	7,434	$184,883,435	602 acres (2.44 km^{2})	Peach Belt (NCAA Division II)
Georgia Southwestern State University (GSSU)	Americus	1906	State University	Michelle Johnston	4,012	$66,093,037	325 acres (1.32 km^{2})	Peach Belt (NCAA Division II)
Middle Georgia State University (MGA)	Macon	1884	State University	Christopher Blake	10,070	$163,703,420	167 acres (0.68 km^{2})	Peach Belt (NCAA Division II)
Savannah State University (SSU)	Savannah	1890	State University, HBCU	Jermaine Whirl	3,193	$106,304,636	165 acres (0.67 km^{2})	SIAC (NCAA Division II)
University of North Georgia (UNG)	Dahlonega	1873	State University, Senior Military College	Michael P. Shannon	20,747	$337,742,826	630 acres (2.5 km^{2})	Peach Belt (NCAA Division II)
Abraham Baldwin Agricultural College (ABAC)	Tifton	1908	State College	Tracy Brundage	4,138	$73,000,596	516 acres (2.09 km^{2})	SSAC (NAIA)
Atlanta Metropolitan State College (AMSC)	Atlanta	1974	State College	Ingrid Thompson-Sellers	1,824	$23,596,656	79 acres (0.32 km^{2})	N/A
College of Coastal Georgia (CCG)	Brunswick	1961	State College	Johnny L. Evans Jr.	3,839	$58,019,072	193 acres (0.78 km^{2})	The Sun (NAIA)
Dalton State College (DSC)	Dalton	1963	State College	John M. Fuchko, III	5,848	$72,226,678	146 acres (0.59 km^{2})	SSAC (NAIA)
Georgia Gwinnett College (GGC)	Lawrenceville	2005	State College	Jann L. Joseph	12,561	$196,468,580	250 acres (1.0 km^{2})	Continental (NAIA)
Georgia Highlands College (GHC)	Rome	1970	State College	Mike Hobbs	6,488	$61,674,153	200 acres (0.81 km^{2})	GCAA (NJCAA)
Gordon State College (GSC)	Barnesville	1852	State College	Donald J. Green	3,522	$43,857,249	125 acres (0.51 km^{2})	GCAA (NJCAA)
South Georgia State College (SGSC)	Douglas	1906	State College	Gregory M. Tanner	2,029	$30,522,380	190 acres (0.77 km^{2})	GCAA (NJCAA)

=== USG designations ===
USG classifies its institutions into four "functional sectors" based on each institution's specific mission and function:

- Research University: Doctoral-granting institutions classified by the Carnegie Classification as "very high" or "high" research activity (R1 and R2, respectively).
- Regional Comprehensive University: Institutions that offer undergraduate and master's-level degrees with some master's-dominant graduate programs.
- State University: Institutions that offer associate's, bachelor's, and master's degrees with limited, select doctoral programs.
- State College: Institutions that offer bachelor's and associate degrees with no graduate programs.

=== Defunct institutions ===
The institutions listed below are no longer independent units of the University System of Georgia; however, they remain operational as instructional sites for their respective successor institutions.

Institution	Main Campus Location	Founded	USG Designation	Defunct	Notes
Armstrong State University	Savannah	1935	State University	2018	Consolidated with Georgia Southern University
Augusta State University	Augusta	1785	State University	2013	Consolidated with Georgia Health Sciences University to form Augusta University
Bainbridge State College	Bainbridge	1970	State College	2017	Consolidated with Abraham Baldwin Agricultural College
Darton State College	Albany	1963	State College	2016	Consolidated with Albany State University
East Georgia State College	Swainsboro	1973	State College	2026	Consolidated with Georgia Southern University
Gainesville State College	Gainesville	1964	State College	2013	Consolidated with North Georgia College and State University to form the University of North Georgia
Georgia Perimeter College	Clarkston	1964	State College	2016	Consolidated with Georgia State University
Macon State College	Macon	1965	State College	2013	Consolidated with Middle Georgia College and subsequently elevated to university status as Middle Georgia State University
Southern Polytechnic State University	Marietta	1948	State University	2015	Consolidated with Kennesaw State University
Waycross College	Waycross	1976	State College	2013	Consolidated with South Georgia State College

Additionally, the Skidaway Institute of Oceanography was aligned with the University of Georgia, which became effective July 1, 2013.

== See also ==
- Student Advisory Council of Georgia – An organizational body composed of the student government presidents at each of the University System's institutions
- Technical College System of Georgia – A separate post-secondary education system which oversees Georgia's technical colleges
- List of colleges and universities in Georgia – A list of all colleges and universities in the state of Georgia
