= Kanade =

Kanade may refer to:

- Mihir Kanade, Indian author and professor
- Kranti Kanade, Indian filmmaker
- Otonose Kanade, VTuber and singer
- Takeo Kanade (born 1945), Japanese computer scientist
  - Kanade–Lucas–Tomasi feature tracker
  - Lucas–Kanade method
  - Tomasi–Kanade factorization
