= Center for Geospatial Research =

- CGR
- Established: 1985
- Research type: Applied, Remote Sensing, Climate, Mapping Science
- Director: Dr. Deepak R. Mishra
- Faculty: Dr. Marguerite Madden, Dr. Sergio Bernardes
- Students: Caleb Adams, Nicholas Neel, Khoa Ngo
- Alumni: Dr. Roy Welch
- Location: Athens, Georgia, 30602; 33.948847°N 83.375237°W
- Campus: University of Georgia
- Affiliations: NASA DEVELOP National Program
- Website: crms.uga.edu

The Center for Geospatial Research at the University of Georgia focuses on remote sensing and climate science. The center is a regional NASA DEVELOP node and was recognized by NASA in 1998 for its outstanding achievements relating to applied climate and environmental sciences, being named a NASA Center of Excellence.

== Founding and History ==
The University of Georgia's Center for Geospatial Research, CGR, was founded in 1985 as the Laboratory for Remote Sensing and Mapping Science. In 1989 the lab was renamed the Center for Remote Sensing and Mapping Science. This Center was founded by Dr. Roy Welch, who served as director from its founding in 1985 until 2003. The Center is now directed by Dr. Marguerite Madden and in 2012 the center was renamed Center for Geospatial Research to better reflect its internal goals. In 2016 the center helped found the UGA Small Satellite Research Laboratory.

== Significant Research ==
=== Publications and Presentations ===
In 2016 research from the Center was used to identify the coastal regions of the United States that were most at risk from sea-level rise due to climate change. This study was one of the first studies to have accounted for ongoing population growth when assessing the potential magnitude of future impacts. Minimally 4.2 million people at risk of inundation were projected to be at risk from sea-level rise in the continental United States.

Researchers at the Center for Geospatial Research have helped students at the UGA Small Satellite Research Laboratory receive grants to build 2 satellites. These satellites will be the first satellites built, designed, and operated by the University of Georgia.

=== NASA DEVELOP ===
Since 2013, the Center for Geospatial Research has been a regional node for the NASA DEVELOP national program and contributes significantly to climate change research. This DEVELOP location specializes in spatial ecology projects under the supervision of Lead Science Advisor, Dr. Marguerite Madden.

Certain DEVELOP work at CGR has focused on identifying key issues regarding Atlanta and its suburbs. Using data from the Landsat 8 and Terra satellites, the team was able to model water flow in the region and help the area build better infrastructure as it grows. The center has also been published in the International Union for Conservation of Natures World Conservation Congress Publication. The study focused on ecological forecasting, reforestation and conservation efforts, and the Colombian primate Cotton-top tamarin.

=== Small Satellites ===
The Center is also aiding the undergraduates of the Small Satellite Research Laboratory with technical knowledge. Faculty members, such as Dr. David Cotten, have given presentations on the possibilities of structure from motion in low Earth orbit and how the Small Satellite Research Laboratory could build the first satellite to perform this technology in orbit.
