= Yingli Tian =

Chinese-American electrical engineer

Yingli Tian (also published as Ying-li Tian) is a Chinese-American electrical engineer known for her research applying image processing to the analysis of facial expressions and their meanings. Her more recent research has focused on assistive technology including the automated recognition of sign language. She is CUNY Distinguished Professor in the Department of Electrical Engineering at the City College of New York.

== Education and career ==
Tian studied precision instrument and opto-electronics engineering at Tianjin University, graduating in 1987. After a master's degree in thermophysical engineering from the same university in 1990, she went to the Chinese University of Hong Kong for doctoral study in electrical engineering, completing her Ph.D. in 1996.

She was a postdoctoral researcher at the Robotics Institute of Carnegie Mellon University, and then worked for IBM Research beginning in 2001, before moving to the City College of New York in 2008.

== Recognition ==
A 2000 paper by Tian on facial expression analysis, with Takeo Kanade and Jeffrey F. Cohn, received the 2019 Test of Time Award at the IEEE International Conference on Automatic Face and Gesture Recognition.

Tian was named to the 2018 class of IEEE Fellows, "for her work in automatic facial expression analysis and human activity understanding and monitoring". In 2020, Tian was elected as a Fellow of the International Association for Pattern Recognition, "for contributions to automatic facial expression analysis and human activity understanding".

The Chinese University of Hong Kong Department of Electrical Engineering named her as a distinguished alumnus in 2020, one of eight alumni so honored, as part of a celebration of the 50th anniversary of the department. She was listed "for her pioneering in automatic facial expression analysis, human activity understanding, and assistive technology and being a top scholar in image understanding".
