= Kinetic depth effect =

Phenomenon of visual perception

The Spinning Dancer is a kinetic, bistable optical illusion resembling a pirouetting female dancer. The dancer can be seen to be spinning alternately one direction, or the other.

In visual perception, the kinetic depth effect is the phenomenon whereby the three-dimensional structural form of an object can be perceived when the object is moving. In the absence of other visual depth cues, this might be the only perception mechanism available to infer the object's shape. Being able to identify a structure from a motion stimulus through the human visual system was shown by Hans Wallach and O'Connell in the 1950s through their experiments.

For example, if a shadow is cast onto a screen by a rotating wire shape, a viewer can readily perceive the shape of the structure behind the screen from the motion and deformation of the shadow.

There are two propositions as to how three-dimensional images are perceived. The experience of three-dimensional images can be caused by differences in the pattern of stimulation on the retina, in comparison to two-dimensional images. Gestalt psychologists hold the view that rules of organization must exist in accordance to the retinal projections of three-dimensional forms which happen to form three-dimensional percepts. Most retinal images of two-dimensional forms lead to two-dimensional forms in experience as well. The other deduction is related to previous experience. However, this assumption does not explain how past experience influences perception of images.

In order to model the calculation of depth values from relative movement, many efforts have been made to infer these values using other information like geometry and measurements of objects and their positions. This is related to the extraction of structure from motion in computer vision. In addition, an individual's ability to realize the kinetic depth effect conclusively shows that the visual system can independently figure the structure from motion problem.

As with other depth cues, the kinetic depth effect is almost always produced in combination with other effects, most notably the motion parallax effect. For instance, the rotating circles illusion and the rotating dots visualization (which is similar in principle to the projected wireframe demonstration mentioned above) rely strongly on the previous knowledge that objects (or parts thereof) further from the observer appear to move more slowly than those that are closer.

The kinetic depth effect can manifest independently, however, even when motion parallax is not present. An example of such a situation is the art installment "The Analysis of Beauty", by the Disinformation project, created as a tribute to William Hogarth's concept of the Serpentine Line (which was presented in his homonymous book).

== Hemispheric differences ==
Sometimes, when looking at rotating three-dimensional silhouettes, they will suddenly appear to change the direction in which they are rotating, even though nothing about the image has changed. This sudden change is because the silhouette lacks any depth cues from shading. Data from an experiment showed that subjects experienced changes more when the image was being processed by their left hemisphere which controls the right side of the visual field.

== See also ==
- Depth perception
- Optical illusion
- Structure from motion (psychophysics)
- Wiggle stereoscopy
