= Small Satellite Research Laboratory =

CubeSat builder at the University of Georgia

UGA Small Satellite Research Laboratory
- SSRL
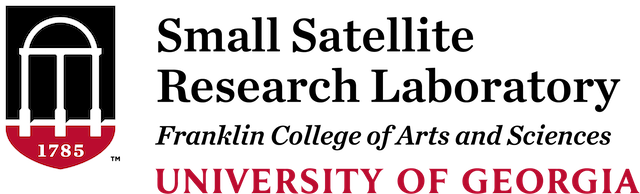
- Established: 2015–2016
- Research type: Remote Sensing, Cube Satellite Development, Spectral Sensors
- Field of research: Remote Sensing, Space AI, CubeSats, Small Satellites
- Dean: Dr. Anna Stenport
- Director: Dr. Deepak Mishra
- Staff: Sydney Whilden (Lab Manager), Dr. David L. Cotten (Past Associate Director)
- Alumni
- Location: Athens, Georgia, 30602; 33.948847°N 83.375237°W
- Campus: University of Georgia
- Affiliations: University Nanosatellite Program, NASA Ames Research Center
- Website: smallsat.uga.edu

The University of Georgia Small Satellite Research Laboratory (SSRL) is a research laboratory which builds CubeSats for Earth observation.

The laboratory was conceived of in late 2015 and officially materialized in 2016 through a collaboration of faculty and students. Its original goal was to launch a student-built spacecraft into low Earth orbit, which it accomplished in 2020 with the Spectral Ocean Color imager (SPOC). Its current focuses are remote Earth observation (remote sensing) and space-based artificial intelligence. The lab is notable for its high number of undergraduate participants; as of the 2024 spring semester, over 300 students had been members of the lab for some period of time between 2016 and 2024.

The SSRL has a Space Act Agreement with the NASA Ames Research Center.

== Founding ==
In 2015, three undergraduate students at the University of Georgia (Caleb Adams, Graham Grable, and Nicholas "Hollis" Neel) had the idea to found an aerospace start-up. Two of the three students had been part of a previous start-up through an accelerator program at the university. Adams and Neel co-founded a company called Spacey Sciences, LLC. The students' initial idea was to build a large, remote-operated, 3D-printed telescope. In a single night, they built a prototype of the telescope at VTHacks in February 2015.

The project was originally intended to be crowdfunded on Kickstarter, but it grew in scope and complexity over time, driving Adams, Neel, and Grable to seek faculty support and research funding. Adams began emailing UGA faculty, and ultimately connected with Dr. Marshall Shepherd in the Franklin College of Arts and Sciences Department of Geography.

The Department of Geography was intrigued by the potential to use CubeSats for Earth observation. Shepherd put the students of Spacey Sciences, LLC in touch with then-associate professor Dr. Deepak R. Mishra and research scientist Dr. David Cotten, who were investigating the possibility of CubeSats for observation of near-coastal ocean health and productivity. The founding group of students entered into collaboration with Mishra and Cotten, forming the rudiments of the Small Satellite Research Laboratory.

As of November 2015, the collaboration was known as the "CubeSat project", with Adams serving as the student leader. In October 2020, the Small Satellite Research Laboratory launched Spectral Ocean Color (SPOC).

Currently, the lab works with two entities: the Air Force Research Laboratory's University Nanosatellite Program is funding the construction of one 6U CubeSat, while Let's Go to Space, Inc. is funding the MEMESat-1 mission, a 2U CubeSat.

The SSRL now consists of over 50 members, and marks the first attempt at a space program at the University of Georgia. The SSRL has stated that it plans to become the university's premier space program, and to establish the school's continual presence in space. This will make the University of Georgia one of the first institutions in the state of Georgia to send a complete satellite into space.

== Missions ==
=== The Spectral Ocean Color (SPOC) imager ===
SPOC
- Mission type: Climate Research
- Operator: UGA Small Satellite Research Laboratory

Spacecraft properties
- Launch mass: 3.99 kilograms (8.8 lb)
- Dimensions: 10cm x 10cm x 34.05cm

Start of mission
- Launch date: October 2, 2020
- Rocket: Antares 230+
- Launch site: Wallops Flight Facility
- Contractor: Northrop Grumman
- Deployment date: November 5, 2020

End of mission
- Decay date: June 25, 2022

Main telescope
- Wavelengths: 400nm–900nm

Instruments
- Hyperspectral Sensor

The Spectral Ocean Color imager, known as SPOC, was a 3U CubeSat. It was the University of Georgia's first satellite mission. SPOC was launched to the International Space Station on October 2, 2020, from NASA Wallops Flight Facility on board the Cygnus NG-14 commercial resupply spacecraft. On November 5, 2020, SPOC was deployed from the International Space Station via the Nanoracks CubeSat Deployer, where it officially began its mission.

The SPOC satellite was selected in by the NASA's Undergraduate Student Instrument Project and NASA's eight CubeSat Launch Initiative to be built in 2016-2018 and launched in 2018, 2019, or 2020.

The primary objective of the SPOC Satellite mission was to perform the first moderate resolution multispectral analysis of the following phenomena off the Georgia coast from low earth orbit: vegetation heath, primary productivity, ocean productivity, near-coastal sediment, organic matter, and mapping the production of shelf waters and salt marshes. The SSRL also sought to build a unique Georgia coastal imagery library that aggregates and classifies all gathered data from SPOC. Data from the SPOC mission will supplement the Georgia Coastal Ecosystems Long Term Ecological Research Program's data with data of Sapelo Island from orbit. The data sets generated by the SPOC satellite will be comparable to NASA's MODIS sensor on the Terra satellite from the spectral ranges of 450nm - 900nm.

=== The Multi-view Onboard Computational Imager (MOCI) Satellite ===
MOCI
- Mission type: Technology Demonstration
- Operator: UGA Small Satellite Research Laboratory
- Website: http://smallsat.uga.edu

Spacecraft properties
- Launch mass: 3.99 kilograms (8.8 lb)
- Dimensions: 10cm x 20cm x 34.05cm

Instruments
- CCD Imaging System

The Multi-view Onboard Computational Imager Satellite, known as the MOCI satellite, is a 6U CubeSat that will be the University of Georgia's second satellite. The MOCI satellite was selected in the ninth iteration of the University Nanosatellite Program, UNP-9. The primary mission of the MOCI satellite will be to perform structure from motion (SfM) in Low Earth Orbit (LEO) and generate 3D point clouds on a landscape scale to generate Digital Elevation Models. This will be the first time a CubeSat has specialized in building 3D models using structure from motion. MOCI will employ customize algorithms for feature extraction, structure from motion, surface reconstruction, data compression, and oceanic anomaly detection.
