= Takeo Kanade =

Japanese computer scientist

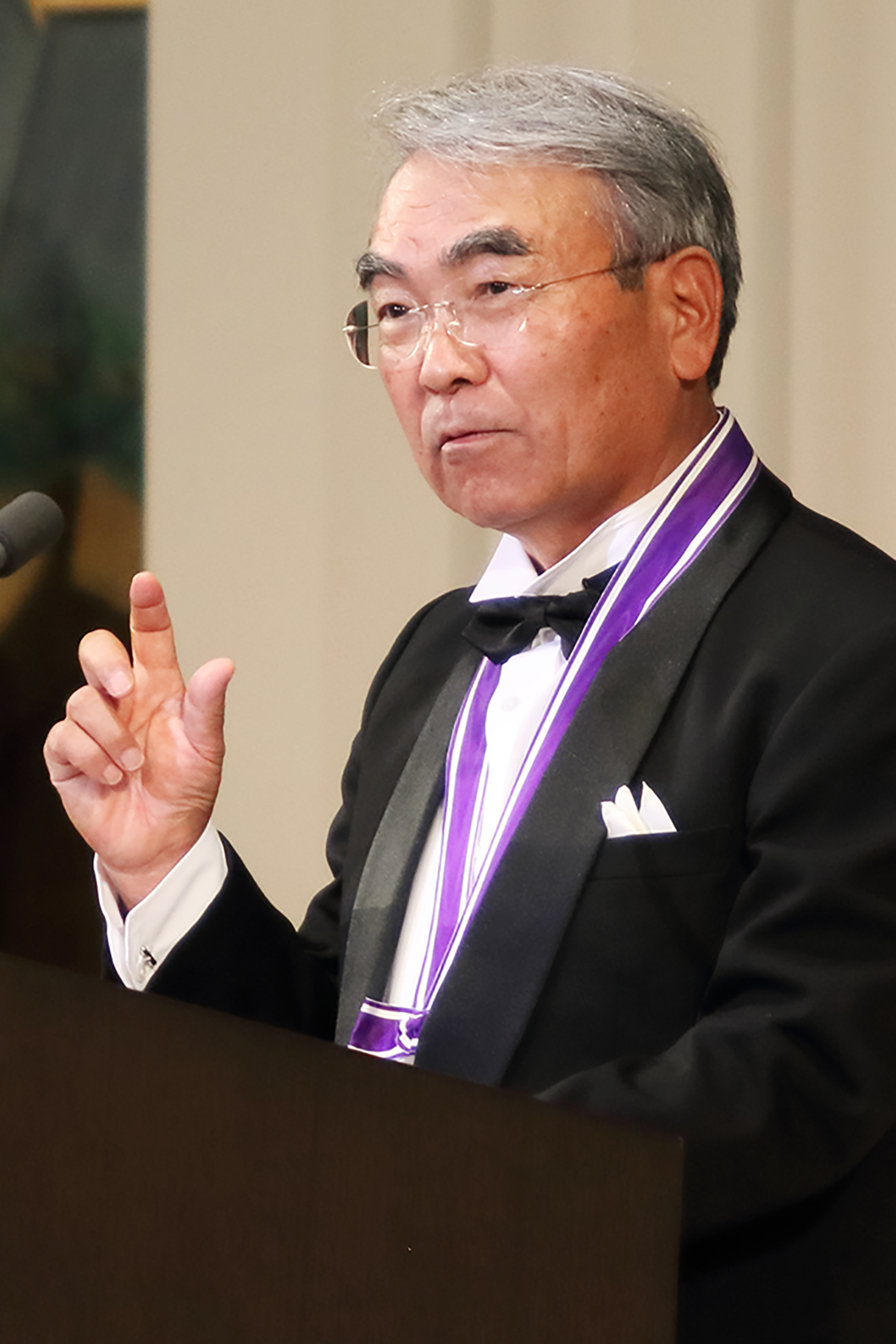
- Kanade at the 2016 Kyoto Prize Presentation Ceremony
- Born: October 24, 1945 (age 80); Hyōgo, Japan
- Education: Kyoto University
- Known for: Lucas–Kanade method Tomasi-Kanade method Face Detection; Virtualized Reality
- Awards: NAE Member (1997); Bower Award (2008); Kyoto Prize (2016); BBVA Foundation Frontiers of Knowledge Award (2023)
- Scientific career
- Fields: Computer vision Robotics
- Workplaces: Carnegie Mellon University; Kyoto University
- Thesis: Picture processing system by computer complex and recognition of human faces (1974)
- Academic advisors: Makoto Nagao

Takeo Kanade (金出 武雄, Kanade Takeo; born October 24, 1945 in Hyōgo) is a Japanese computer scientist and one of the world's foremost researchers in computer vision. He is U.A. and Helen Whitaker Professor at Carnegie Mellon School of Computer Science. He has approximately 300 peer-reviewed academic publications and holds around 20 patents.

== Honors and achievements ==
- In 1990 he was an inaugural Fellow of the Association for the Advancement of Artificial Intelligence
- In 1997, he was elected to the US National Academy of Engineering for contributions to computer vision and robotics.
- In 1997, he was elected to the American Academy of Arts and Sciences
- In 1999 he was inducted as a Fellow of the Association for Computing Machinery.
- In 2008 Kanade received the Bower Award and Prize for Achievement in Science from The Franklin Institute in Philadelphia, Pennsylvania.
- A special event called TK60: Celebrating Takeo Kanade's vision was held to commemorate his 60th birthday. This event was attended by prominent computer vision researchers.
- Elected member of American Association of Artificial Intelligence, Robotics Society of Japan, and Institute of Electronics and Communication Engineers of Japan
- Marr Prize, 1990 for the paper Shape from Interreflections which he co-authored with Shree K. Nayar and Katsushi Ikeuchi
- Longuet-Higgins Prize for lasting contribution in computer vision at
  - CVPR 2006 for the paper "Neural Network-Based Face Detection" coauthored with H. Rowley and S. Baluja
  - CVPR 2008 for the paper "Probabilistic modeling of local appearance and spatial relationships for object recognition" coauthored with H Schneiderman
- The other awards he has received include the C&C Award, the Joseph Engelberger Award, FIT Funai Accomplishment Award, the Allen Newell Research Excellence Award, and the JARA Award.
- He has served for many government, industrial, and university advisory boards, including the Aeronautics and Space Engineering Board (ASEB) of the National Research Council, NASA's Advanced Technology Advisory Committee, PITAC Panel for Transforming Healthcare Panel, and the Advisory Board of Canadian Institute for Advanced Research.
- In 2016 Kanade received the Kyoto Prize in Information Sciences.
- In 2019 he was the recipient of Armenia's Global High-Tech Award.
- In 2023 he was awarded the BBVA Foundation Frontiers of Knowledge Award.

== Notable works ==
- Lucas–Kanade method
- One of the earliest face detectors
- Tomasi–Kanade factorization method
- Virtualized Reality
- Multi-baseline stereo and the world's first full-image video-rate stereo machine
- VLSI computational sensors
- Shape recovery from line drawings (known as Origami World theory and skew symmetry)
- Kanade–Lucas–Tomasi feature tracker
