= History of Georgia Bulldogs football =

The Georgia Bulldogs football team represents the University of Georgia in American football.

== Overview ==
=== Early history (1892–1938) ===
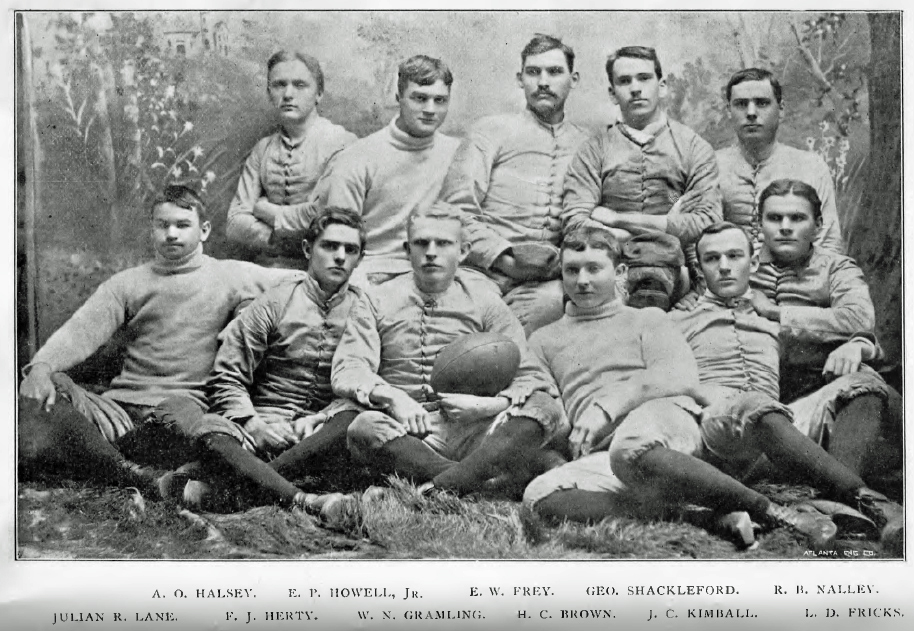
The first football team of 1892.

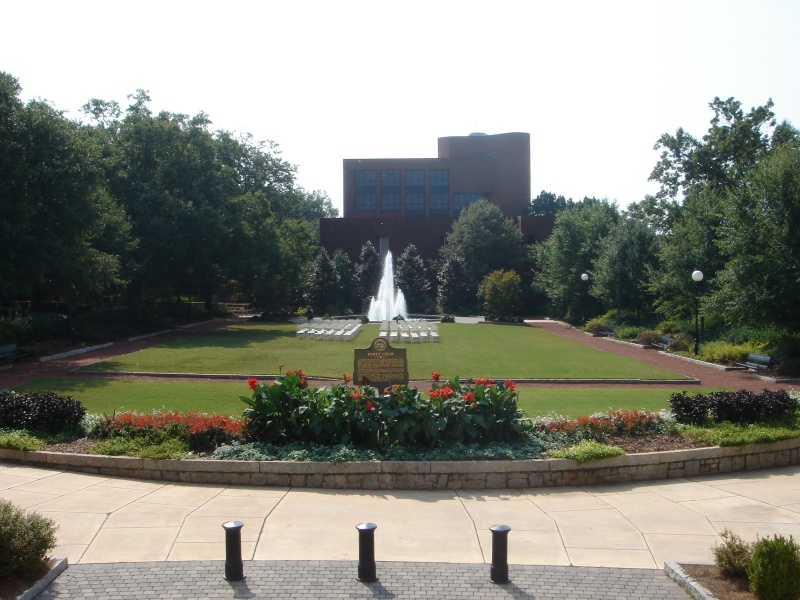
Herty Field was Georgia's first football venue. It was used until 1911. (photo October 2005)

Georgia's football program began in 1892, when Dr. Charles Herty, a chemistry professor and former player at Johns Hopkins, assembled a team and arranged a game against Mercer University on January 30, 1892. This was the first intercollegiate football game played in the deep south. Playing on what would later be called Herty Field, Georgia beat Mercer 50–0. Georgia's second game was on February 20, 1892, against Auburn University, inaugurating what would come to be known as the Deep South's Oldest Rivalry. From 1892 to 1909, the Georgia Bulldogs changed head coaches frequently, with 14 different coaches in a 17-year period. Their combined record was 47–52–10 (.477 winning percentage). During its early years, Georgia's greatest success came during Glenn "Pop" Warner's tenure from 1895 to 1896. It is thought that the first forward pass in football occurred in 1895 in a game between Georgia and North Carolina when, out of desperation, the ball was thrown by the North Carolina quarterback instead of punted and a North Carolina player caught the ball. In 1896, Warner's Georgia team, led by quarterback Richard Von Albade Gammon, recorded the program's first conference championship, winning the Southern Intercollegiate Athletic Association (SIAA) championship with a 3–0 conference record. Georgia's overall season record was 4–0, which marked the team's first undefeated season, as well. In 1897, the team acquired Reynolds Tichenor and moved Gammon to fullback. The program was nearly terminated when Gammon died as a result of injuries sustained in a game against the University of Virginia. The Georgia state legislature quickly passed a bill abolishing collegiate football in the state, but the bill was vetoed by Governor William Yates Atkinson, based upon an appeal from Gammon's mother, Rosalind Gammon.

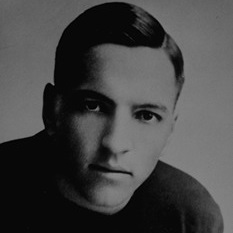
Bob McWhorter

Beginning in 1910, Georgia started experiencing stability in its head coaches. From 1910 to 1963, Georgia had 7 head coaches and a record of 307–180–33 (a .622 winning percentage). 1910 saw the introduction of coach Bill Cunningham and a player who would be Georgia's first All-American in Bob McWhorter, College Football Hall of Fame running back. Georgia won its first two games of 1910 by a combined 180–0. In 1911, Georgia moved its playing field from Herty Field to Sanford Field, where wooden stands were built. In 1911 and 1912 Georgia suffered its only loss to SIAA champion Vanderbilt. George "Kid" Woodruff was quarterback and captain in 1911. "Kid" and his older brother "Big Kid" were both quarterbacks for the Bulldogs and were the namesakes of Woodruff Hall. It was "Kid" who later led the Bulldogs to their first claim to a national championship, the third former Bulldog player to serve as coach. In 1927, Georgia's "dream and wonder team" finished the season 9–1 and could stake a claim to the national championship by finishing #1 in at least one national poll. 1913 was when McWhorter was Georgia's first ever All-American. The next season saw the second, quarterback David Paddock. 1914 was a lackluster 3–5–1 season on paper but included an upset of Sewanee and closed with a scoreless tie against Auburn. Sewanee had a 55-game unbeaten streak at home and the Bulldogs won 7–6 on a Tom Thrash touchdown and John G. Henderson conversion. Auburn was undefeated and defending SIAA champion having been undefeated the year before. The Tigers finished the season as co-champion. In 1915, Henderson was the head of a group of three men, one behind the other with his hands upon the shoulders of the one in front, to counter Georgia Tech's jump shift offense utilized by John Heisman. The game ended in a scoreless tie. The Bulldogs did not field a team for the 1917 or 1918 season due to World War I.

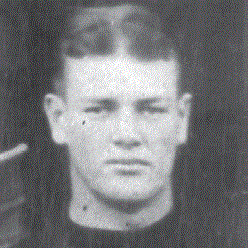
Joe Bennett

Herman Stegeman coached the Bulldogs to an 8–0 record in 1920, when the team was named co-champion of the SIAA with rival Georgia Tech and posted the conference's best record. The "ten second backfield" (Note: The term "ten second backfield" generally refers to players capable (or thought to be capable) of running a 100-yard dash in 10 seconds—that is, fast runners.) of 1920 led by Buck Cheves featured on the team– the first dubbed "the Bulldogs." In 1921 not one team all year scored on Georgia through its line. The line included Joe Bennett, Bum Day, Artie Pew, Owen Reynolds, and Puss Whelchel. Jim Taylor was a substitute. Vanderbilt executed a trick onside kick from scrimmage to tie the score 7–7 and share the SIAA title between the two. It was said Lynn Bomar stopped five Georgia touchdowns. Day played for Georgia Tech in 1918 and was the first southern player selected first-team All-American by Walter Camp. Bennett and Whelchel were both notorious kick blockers; "Prior to the 1960s, Bennett is likely Georgia's most outstanding tackle." In 1922 Georgia joined the Southern Conference. In 1923, Vanderbilt defeated Georgia by a lopsided score of 35 to 7. Morgan Blake, sportswriter in the Atlanta Journal, wrote "No southern team has given the Georgia Bulldogs such a licking in a decade." Georgia was labeled "Dixie's top team;" its only loss up to that point coming against traditional powerhouse Yale. In 1924, Georgia defeated Vanderbilt for the second time ever and the first time since 1898, via a Scrappy Moore drop kick; a victory clouded by the brain hemorrhage sustained by Lynn Bomar from a kick to the chin. In 1927, Georgia's "dream and wonder team" finished the season 9–1 and could stake a claim to the national championship by finishing #1 in at least one national poll. The 1927 Bulldogs were the first in school history to defeat Yale and went undefeated until the season's final game against Georgia Tech–the next season's national champion. Though still picked by some as national champion, the loss to Tech negated any claim to the conference title. Harry Mehre coached the Bulldogs from 1928 to 1937, but perhaps his most memorable game was in 1929. October 12, 1929, was the inaugural game in the newly completed Sanford Stadium and Mehre's Bulldogs responded with an upset victory over the powerhouse of the day, Yale University, winning 15–0. In that game, Vernon "Catfish" Smith scored all 15 points for Georgia. As head coach, Mehre compiled a 59–34–6 record (.626 winning percentage), but was never able to win a conference championship. Mehre left after ten seasons to accept the head football coach position at Ole Miss.

=== Wally Butts era (1939–1960) ===
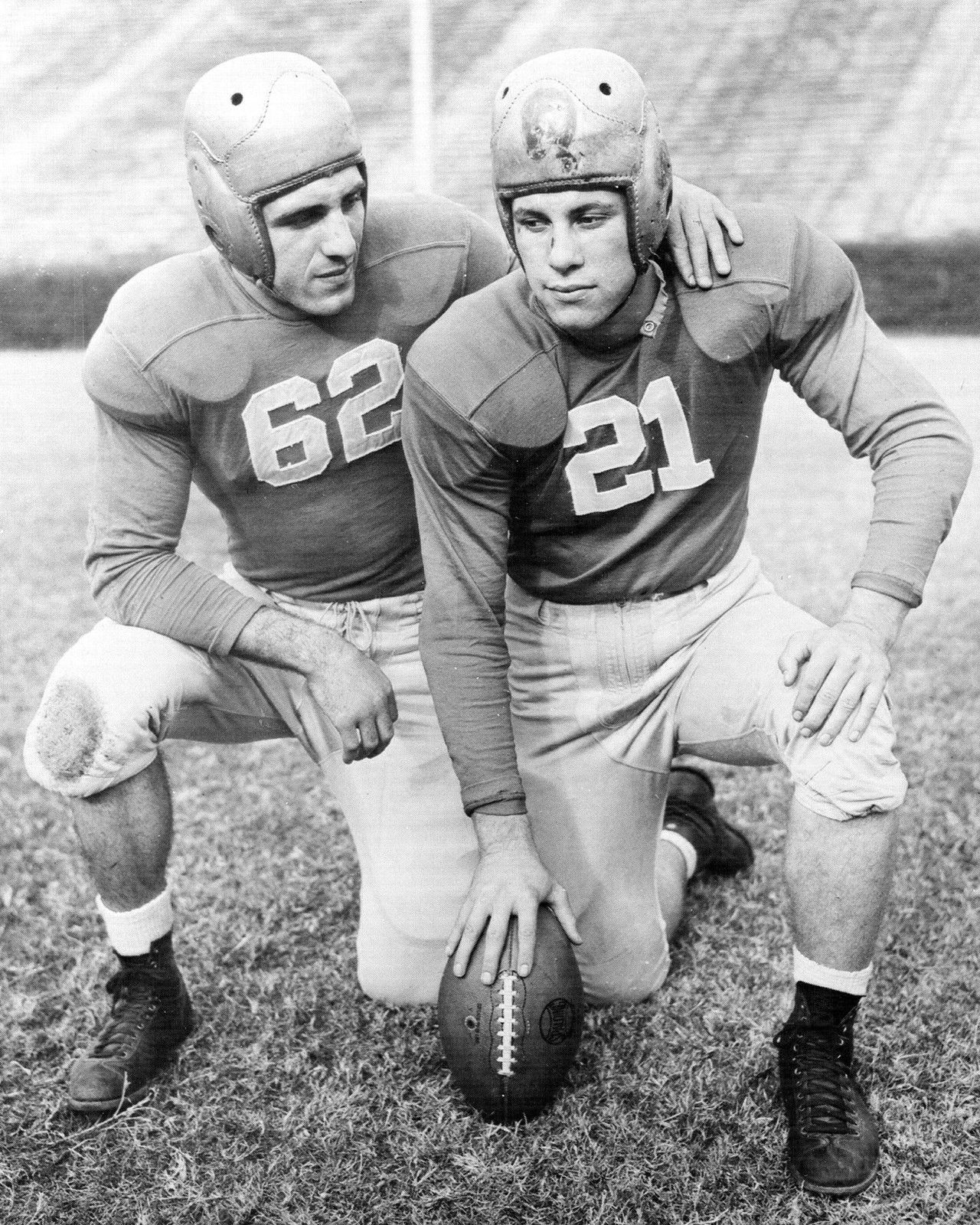
Wally Butts coached the team from 1939 to 1960. Charley Trippi (left) and Frank Sinkwich (right), key players.

Wally Butts coached the Bulldogs from 1939 to 1960 and continued as athletic director until 1963. Butts came to UGA as an assistant to Joel Hunt in 1938, but Hunt left after a 5–4–1 season to take over at Wyoming; Butts succeeded him. During his tenure as head coach, Georgia had a claim to the national championship in 1942 being selected by 6 polls recognized by the NCAA Division I-A college football national championship (Ohio St. was also selected by 6 polls, including the AP, and Wisconsin was selected by one poll), and in 1946 after finishing first in at least one national poll and/or rating system. Butts coached 1942 Heisman Trophy winner Frank Sinkwich and Maxwell Award winner Charley Trippi. His teams also won four SEC championships – 1942, 1946, 1948 and 1959. As head coach, Butts posted a 140–86–9 record (.615 winning percentage); his bowl record was 5–2–1. Butts was inducted into the College Football Hall of Fame in 1997.

=== Johnny Griffith era (1961–1963) ===
Johnny Griffith, a former player and assistant coach to Butts, succeeded him in 1961. Butts' last few seasons had been somewhat pedestrian apart from an SEC title-winning season in 1959, despite the presence of future Pro Football Hall of Famer Fran Tarkenton. Things did not get any better under Griffith and he was only able to compile a 10–16–4 record during his three-year term as head coach. While there were few successes during this time as head coach, he did have two big victories, a 30–21 upset win over Auburn in 1962 and a 31–14 win over heavily favored Miami in 1963. He resigned in December 1963 after going 10–16–2, including a combined 1–8 against Georgia Tech, Florida, and Auburn.

=== Vince Dooley era (1964–1988) ===
Vince Dooley, an assistant at Auburn, took over for the 1964 season. He held the head coach position longer than any other Bulldogs coach, leading the Bulldogs from 1964 to 1988. During his tenure as head coach, Georgia won its second consensus national championship in 1980, winning the Grantland Rice Award. Dooley's 1968 team finished first in at least one national poll, giving Georgia a claim to the national championship in that year. The 1967 Cotton Bowl win over SMU made Georgia only the 3rd school in college football history to have won all 4 of the historical major bowls, Rose, Cotton, Sugar, Orange. His teams gave Georgia six SEC Championships and he coached 1982 Heisman Trophy and Maxwell Award winner Herschel Walker, 1968 Outland Trophy winner Bill Stanfill and 40 All-Americans. Dooley won the Amos Alonzo Stagg Award in 2001. He compiled a 201–77–10 record (.715 winning percentage), which included 20 bowl appearances. His bowl record was 8–10–2. From 1976 to 1982, his teams were in contention for the national title 4 times (1976, 1980, 1981, and 1982). His 6 SEC titles ties him for second place all time amongst SEC coaches for SEC titles. Dooley's offenses were known primarily for running the football. He converted UGA's single-wing offense to a Split-Back Veer in the early 1970s, and later ran a professional I-type offense with the development of Herschel Walker. For a while during the 1980s UGA was known as "Tailback U." Dooley was inducted in the College Football Hall of Fame in 1997 In 1981, Professor Jan Kemp complained that Georgia officials had intervened allowing nine college football players to pass a remedial English course, allowing them to play against Pittsburgh in the Sugar Bowl. The board of regents of the University System of Georgia issued a report in April 1986 implicating Dr. Fred C. Davison and the Georgia athletic department, headed by Dooley, who was also the football coach, in a pattern of academic abuse in the admission and advancement of student-athletes over the previous four years.

=== Ray Goff era (1989–1995) ===
Ray Goff was promoted from assistant coach and took over as head coach in 1989. He coached the Bulldogs until 1995, posting a 46–34–1 record (.574 winning percentage). Goff's tenure got off to a slow start, with just ten wins in his first two seasons, before reeling off nine wins in 1991 and ten in 1992; the latter campaign finished with Georgia ranked eighth by the Coaches Poll. Over the next three years, Goff's Bulldogs never again posted as many as seven wins. His teams were 0–5 against Tennessee, 1–6 against Florida, 2–4–1 against Auburn, 5–2 against Georgia Tech and won no conference titles. During his time at Georgia, Goff was often derisively referred to as Ray "Goof", a nickname given to him by disgruntled fans, and even rival coaches. There was one incident in which an aircraft flew over Sanford Stadium during the 1990 Georgia Tech game towing a banner reading "'Fire Ray Goof'". This nickname was resurrected after Goff's teams began to fall below expectations again. Goff had a 2–2 bowl record. Goff's 1995 team was on the receiving end of Steve Spurrier's "Half a Hundred" game in which his Florida Gators team put up 52 points on the beleaguered Bulldogs. They were the first and, to date, only team to do so inside Sanford Stadium. He was fired at the end of that injury-plagued season, despite the Bulldogs being invited to the Peach Bowl.

=== Jim Donnan era (1996–2000) ===
Jim Donnan left Marshall and took over as head coach of the Bulldogs in 1996 and coached the team until 2000, posting a 40–19 record (.678 winning percentage). He was the first head football coach in UGA history to lead teams to four consecutive bowl victories. Under Donnan, the Bulldogs won the 1998 Outback Bowl, the 1998 Peach Bowl, the 2000 Outback Bowl, and the 2000 Oahu Bowl. Before the 1997 game against Mississippi State, Donnan drove a steamroller into practice and told his players they "were either going to be the steamroller or the pavement"; Georgia won the game, 47–0.

Donnan was fired by University President Michael F. Adams, against the wishes of athletic director Vince Dooley, in 2000 after the Bulldogs posted two consecutive eight-win seasons and three consecutive losses against Georgia Tech. Before the 2000 season, Georgia, led by a preseason Heisman Trophy candidate (Quincy Carter), was predicted by some prognosticators to contend for the national championship. However, an early disappointing loss to rival South Carolina and later losses to rivals Florida, Auburn, along with the loss to Tech frustrated many in the fan base. Donnan's inability to return the program to the national prominence of Dooley's era, compete with longtime SEC Eastern Division rivals and off-the-field problems for players, are believed to be the reasons for his dismissal. Donnan was elected to the College Football Hall of Fame as a coach in 2009.

=== Mark Richt era (2001–2015) ===
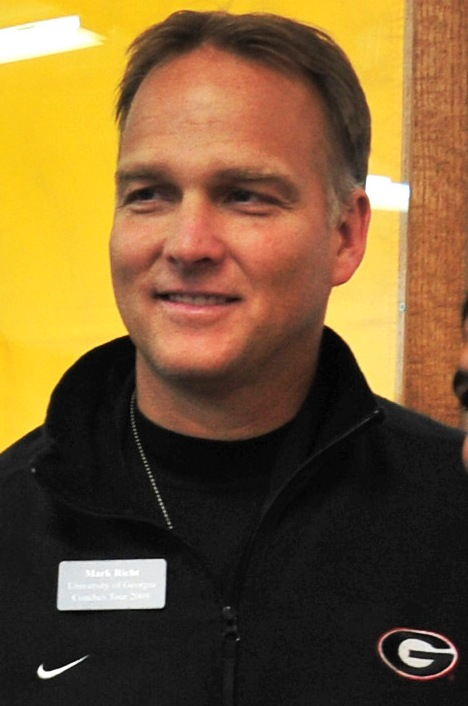
Mark Richt

Mark Richt joined the Bulldogs in 2001 after serving as the offensive coordinator of the Florida State Seminoles under Bobby Bowden. During Richt's tenure, Georgia won two SEC championships – 2002 and 2005 – and 6 of their 7 SEC East Division Championships – 2002, 2003, 2005, 2007, 2011, and 2012. (Out of those years Georgia represented the East in the SEC Championship Game in all but 2007.) Including bowl games, Richt's record, as of January 14, 2014, was 126–45 for a (.737 winning percentage) and 72–32 (.692) in the SEC. His bowl record through 2014 was 8–5. On October 8, 2011, Richt won his 100th career game as UGA's coach against Tennessee at Neyland Stadium 20–12.

Under Richt, Georgia was 10–5 against Tennessee, 5–10 against Florida, 10–5 against Auburn, and 13–2 against Georgia Tech. In 2007, under Richt, Georgia defeated Florida and Auburn in the same season for the first time since 1982. In 2011, under Richt, Georgia defeated Tennessee, Florida, Auburn, and Georgia Tech in the same season for the first time since 1981. Richt never lost a game as Georgia's head coach at Georgia Tech's Bobby Dodd Stadium in Atlanta, finishing 8–0. Having won more Georgia-Georgia Tech match ups at the stadium than even its namesake, the legendary Bobby Dodd, many Georgia fans to this day refer to Georgia Tech's home stadium as "Historic Mark Richt Field".

Despite his success, some supporters began to question whether the well-liked Richt could take the program to a higher level. Although some rivals had better facilities and larger recruiting budgets during most of his time in Athens, many supporters felt that given its in-state talent, Georgia should be a contender for the national championship on a regular basis. On November 29, 2015, Mark Richt and Georgia mutually agreed to part ways after 15 seasons.

=== Kirby Smart era (2016–present) ===
On December 6, 2015; Alabama defensive coordinator and UGA alumnus Kirby Smart was announced as the 26th head coach of the Georgia Bulldogs. In his second year as head coach of the Bulldogs, Smart led his team to an appearance in the national championship game where they lost to Alabama 26–23. On January 10, 2022, Smart and the Bulldogs won their third College Football National Championship in a game against the Alabama Crimson Tide in Indianapolis, Indiana. Georgia won 33–18 against Alabama. During the 2021 and 2022 season Smart led the Bulldogs to two undefeated conference play. They are the only third team to do this in SEC history, behind Florida and Alabama. On January 9, 2023, Georgia would go on to win back-to-back National Championships, which is the first time a team has ever done so in the College Football Playoff era. They set a record for the largest bowl game margin of victory with a 65–7 title win over the TCU Horned Frogs (58-point difference), which they broke with a 63–3 victory over the Florida State Seminoles in the 2023 Orange Bowl.
