= Damon Evans =

Damon Evans may refer to:

- Damon Evans (athletic director)
- Damon Evans (actor)
