= List of Georgia Bulldogs head football coaches =

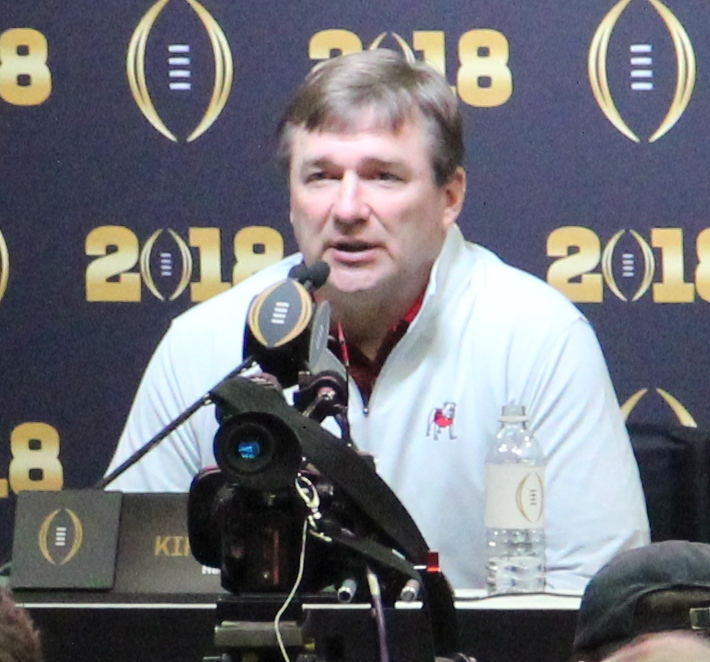
Kirby Smart, 26th and current head coach of the Georgia Bulldogs

The Georgia Bulldogs college football team represents the University of Georgia in the Southeastern Conference (SEC). The Bulldogs compete as part of the National Collegiate Athletic Association (NCAA) Division I Football Bowl Subdivision. The school has had 26 head coaches since it began play during the 1892 season. Kirby Smart is the current head coach of the bulldogs.

The team has played more than 1,300 games over 132 seasons of Georgia football. Six coaches have led the Bulldogs to postseason bowl games: Wally Butts, Vince Dooley, Ray Goff, Jim Donnan, Mark Richt, and Kirby Smart. Five coaches also won conference championships: Herman Stegeman won one as a member of the Southern Intercollegiate Athletic Association; Butts, Dooley, Richt, and Smart won a combined 15 as a member of the SEC. During their tenures, Butts and Dooley each won one and Smart won two national championship with the Bulldogs.

Dooley is the leader in seasons coached and games won, with 201 victories during his 25 years with the Bulldogs. Smart has the highest winning percentage with a record of 105–19 (.847), and Charles A. Barnard has the lowest winning percentage at 1–5 (.167). Five of the team's coaches—Pop Warner, Butts, Dooley, Donnan, and Richt—have been inducted into the College Football Hall of Fame.

== Key ==
Key to symbols in coaches list
| General | | Overall | | Conference | | Postseason (Note: Although the first Rose Bowl Game was played in 1902, it has been continuously played since the 1916 game, and is recognized as the oldest bowl game by the NCAA. "—" indicates any season prior to 1916 when postseason games were not played.) | |
|---|---|---|---|---|---|---|---|
| No. | Order of coaches (Note: A running total of the number of head coaches, with coaches who served separate tenures being counted only once. Interim head coaches are represented with "Int" and are not counted in the running total. "—" indicates the team played but either without a coach or no coach is on record. "X" indicates an interim year without play.) | GC | Games coached | CW | Conference wins | PW | Postseason wins |
| DC | Division championships | OW | Overall wins | CL | Conference losses | PL | Postseason losses |
| CC | Conference championships | OL | Overall losses | CT | Conference ties | PT | Postseason ties |
| NC | National championships | OT | Overall ties (Note: Overtime rules in college football were introduced in 1996, making ties impossible in the period since.) | C% | Conference winning percentage | | |
| † | Elected to the College Football Hall of Fame | O% | Overall winning percentage (Note: When computing the win–loss percentage, a tie counts as half a win and half a loss.) | | | | |

== Coaches ==
List of head football coaches showing season(s) coached, overall records, conference records, postseason records, championships and selected awards (Note: Statistics correct as of the end of the 2025 NCAA Division I FBS football season.)
| No. | Name | Term (Note: Georgia did not field a team for the 1917 or 1918 seasons due to World War I.) | Season(s) | GC | OW | OL | OT | O% | CW | CL | CT | C% | PW | PL | PT | DC (Note: Divisional champions have advanced to the SEC Championship Game since the institution of divisional play beginning in the 1992 season. Since that time, Georgia has competed as a member of the SEC East.) | CC | NC | Awards |
|---|---|---|---|---|---|---|---|---|---|---|---|---|---|---|---|---|---|---|---|
| 1 | Charles Herty | 1892 | 1 | 2 | 1 | 1 | 0 | 0.500 | — | — | — | — | — | — | — | — | — | 0 | — |
| 2 | Ernest Brown | 1893 | 1 | 5 | 2 | 2 | 1 | 0.500 | — | — | — | — | — | — | — | — | — | 0 | — |
| 3 | Robert Winston | 1894 | 1 | 6 | 5 | 1 | 0 | 0.833 | — | — | — | — | — | — | — | — | — | 0 | — |
| 4 | Pop Warner^{†} | 1895–1896 | 2 | 11 | 7 | 4 | 0 | 0.636 | 5 | 4 | 0 | 0.556 | — | — | — | — | 0 | 0 | — |
| 5 | Charles McCarthy | 1897–1898 | 2 | 9 | 6 | 3 | 0 | 0.667 | 5 | 2 | 0 | 0.714 | — | — | — | — | 0 | 0 | — |
| 6 | Gordon Saussy | 1899 | 1 | 6 | 2 | 3 | 1 | 0.417 | 2 | 3 | 1 | 0.417 | — | — | — | — | 0 | 0 | — |
| 7 | E. E. Jones | 1900 | 1 | 6 | 2 | 4 | 0 | 0.333 | 1 | 3 | 0 | 0.250 | — | — | — | — | 0 | 0 | — |
| 8 | William A. Reynolds | 1901–1902 | 2 | 15 | 5 | 7 | 3 | 0.433 | 4 | 7 | 3 | 0.393 | — | — | — | — | 0 | 0 | — |
| 9 | Marvin D. Dickinson | 1903, 1905 | 1, 1 | 13 | 4 | 9 | 0 | 0.308 | 3 | 7 | 0 | 0.300 | — | — | — | — | 0 | 0 | — |
| 10 | Charles A. Barnard | 1904 | 1 | 6 | 1 | 5 | 0 | 0.167 | 0 | 4 | 0 | .000 | — | — | — | — | 0 | 0 | — |
| 11 | George S. Whitney | 1906–1907 | 2 | 15 | 6 | 7 | 2 | 0.467 | 3 | 6 | 2 | 0.364 | — | — | — | — | 0 | 0 | — |
| 12 | Branch Bocock | 1908 | 1 | 8 | 5 | 2 | 1 | 0.688 | 3 | 2 | 1 | 0.583 | — | — | — | — | 0 | 0 | — |
| 13 | Joseph Coulter (Note: Joseph Coulter and Frank Dobson are credited as co-head coaches for the 1909 season.) | 1909 | 1 | 7 | 1 | 4 | 2 | 0.286 | 1 | 4 | 1 | 0.250 | — | — | — | — | 0 | 0 | — |
| 14 | Frank Dobson | 1909 | 1 | 7 | 1 | 4 | 2 | 0.286 | 1 | 4 | 1 | 0.250 | — | — | — | — | 0 | 0 | — |
| 15 | W. A. Cunningham | 1910–1916, 1919 | 7, 1 | 70 | 43 | 18 | 9 | 0.679 | 37 | 17 | 9 | 0.659 | 0 | 0 | 0 | — | 0 | 0 | — |
| 16 | Herman Stegeman | 1920–1922 | 3 | 29 | 20 | 6 | 3 | 0.741 | 15 | 3 | 3 | 0.786 | 0 | 0 | 0 | — | 1 | 0 | — |
| 17 | George Cecil Woodruff | 1923–1927 | 5 | 47 | 30 | 16 | 1 | 0.649 | 21 | 10 | 0 | 0.677 | 0 | 0 | 0 | — | 0 | 0 | — |
| 18 | Harry Mehre | 1928–1937 | 10 | 99 | 59 | 34 | 6 | 0.626 | 29 | 25 | 5 | 0.500 | 0 | 0 | 0 | — | 0 | 0 | — |
| 19 | Joel Hunt | 1938 | 1 | 10 | 5 | 4 | 1 | 0.550 | 1 | 2 | 1 | 0.375 | 0 | 0 | 0 | — | 0 | 0 | — |
| 20 | Wally Butts^{†} | 1939–1960 | 22 | 235 | 140 | 86 | 9 | 0.615 | 66 | 60 | 5 | 0.523 | 5 | 2 | 1 | — | 4 | 1 – 1942 | AP SEC Coach of the Year (1946); SEC Coach of the Year (1942, 1946, 1959) |
| 21 | Johnny Griffith | 1961–1963 | 3 | 30 | 10 | 16 | 4 | 0.400 | 6 | 12 | 1 | 0.342 | 0 | 0 | 0 | — | 0 | 0 | — |
| 22 | Vince Dooley^{†} | 1964–1988 | 25 | 288 | 201 | 77 | 10 | 0.715 | 108 | 41 | 4 | 0.719 | 8 | 10 | 2 | — | 6 | 1 – 1980 | Bobby Dodd Coach of the Year Award (1976); AFCA Coach of the Year (1980); FWAA Coach of the Year (1980); Sporting News College Football Coach of the Year (1980); Walter Camp Coach of the Year Award (1980); AP SEC Coach of the Year (1966, 1968, 1976, 1980); UPI SEC Coach of the Year (1966, 1968, 1976); SEC Coach of the Year (1966, 1968, 1976, 1978, 1980) |
| 23 | Ray Goff | 1989–1995 | 7 | 81 | 46 | 34 | 1 | 0.574 | 24 | 28 | 1 | 0.462 | 2 | 2 | 0 | 0 | 0 | 0 | — |
| 24 | Jim Donnan^{†} | 1996–2000 | 5 | 59 | 40 | 19 | — | 0.678 | 25 | 15 | — | 0.625 | 4 | 0 | — | 0 | 0 | 0 | SEC Coach of the Year (1997) |
| 25 | Mark Richt^{†} | 2001–2015 | 15 | 196 | 145 | 51 | — | 0.740 | 83 | 37 | — | 0.692 | 9 | 5 | — | 5 | 2 | 0 | AP SEC Coach of the Year (2002); SEC Coach of the Year (2002, 2005) |
| 26 | Kirby Smart | 2016–present | 10 | 138 | 117 | 21 | — | 0.848 | 69 | 12 | — | 0.852 | 9 | 4 | — | 4 | 5 | 2 – 2021, 2022 | AP SEC Coach of the Year (2017); SEC Coach of the Year (2017, 2021, 2022) |
