= Jere Morehead =

President of University of Georgia

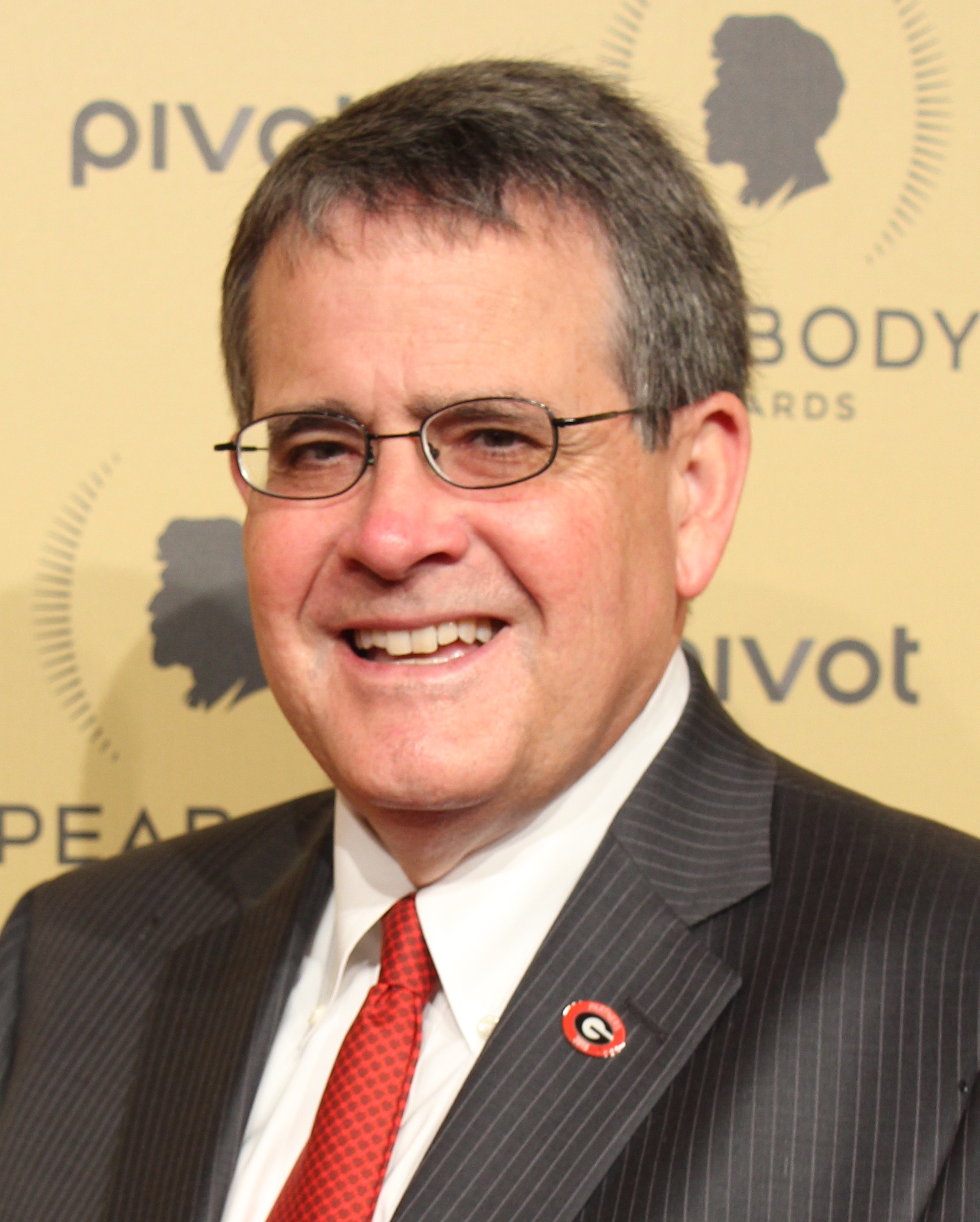
- Morehead at the 74th Annual Peabody Awards in 2015

22nd President of the University of Georgia
- Incumbent
- Assumed office July 1, 2013
- Preceded by: Michael F. Adams

Personal details
- Born: Jere Wade Morehead; November 25, 1956 (age 69) Lakeland, Florida, U.S.
- Education: Georgia State University (BA); University of Georgia (JD)

Jere Wade Morehead (born November 25, 1956) is an American lawyer who is the 22nd president of the University of Georgia. He is also the Josiah Meigs Professor of Legal Studies at the University of Georgia's Terry College of Business, and was previously senior vice president for academic affairs and provost.

== Early life and education ==
Jere Morehead was born in Lakeland, Florida, and moved with his family to Atlanta as a teenager. He enrolled at Georgia State University in 1973 at the age of 16, graduating Omicron Delta Kappa with a Bachelor of Arts degree in 1977. He went on to attend the University of Georgia School of Law, graduating with a Juris Doctor degree in 1980 at the age of 23.

== Career ==
=== Legal career ===
Morehead served as an Assistant United States Attorney from 1980 to 1986, and a Special Assistant United States Attorney from 1986 to 1987.

=== Academic career ===
In 1986, he returned to the University of Georgia as assistant professor of legal studies in the Terry College of Business. He has held an academic appointment within Terry College ever since, attaining the rank of associate professor in 1992 and full professor in 1999. In 1995, he served as a visiting professor of business law at the University of Michigan. He is an author of several books and book chapters, including The Legal and Regulatory Environment of Business, he has published scholarly articles on legal topics ranging from export controls to jury selection, and was editor-in-chief of the American Business Law Journal. He was awarded the Russell Award for Excellence in Undergraduate Teaching, the Terry College of Business Teacher of the Year Award, the Lothar Tresp Outstanding Honors Professor Award, and in 2004, received a Josiah Meigs Distinguished Teaching Professorship, one of the University of Georgia's highest honors for a classroom teacher. From 1986 to 1995, he was advisor for the University of Georgia School of Law's award-winning moot court team, and he has since served as a judge for a number of moot court competitions.

=== Administrative career ===
Morehead was appointed interim executive director of the University of Georgia Office of Legal Affairs in 1998; in 1999, he became associate provost and director of the university's Honors Program including overseeing the creation of the Washington Semester Program, which has enabled more than 2,000 students to work as interns in the nation's capital. In 2004, he was promoted to vice provost for academic affairs; he then served as vice president for instruction from December 2006 to December 2009. His memberships included vice chair of the university's Research Foundation, a trustee of the University of Georgia Foundation and of the university's Real Estate Foundation, and board memberships of Georgia Research Alliance and Emory University Candler School of Theology.

In late 2009, he was named senior vice president for academic affairs and provost of the University of Georgia.

=== Presidency ===
After the number of candidates was reduced to nine including five university presidents, three provosts, and one dean, on January 28, 2013, Morehead was announced as the sole finalist to be the 22nd president of the University of Georgia. Following a waiting period required by state law, the board of regents confirmed him to his new position, and he assumed office on July 1, 2013. He is the sixth president to be a hire from within the university, with the most recent prior being O.C. Aderhold in 1950.

As a Meigs Distinguished Teaching Professor, he continues to teach.

== Awards and honors ==
In 2021, Morehead received the Circle of Excellence Award from the Council for Advancement and Support of Education.

UGA's Honors College is named in his honor.
