= Edward T. Foote II =

American academic (1937–2016)

- Foote in 1998

4th President of the University of Miami
- In office March 1981 – June 1, 2001
- Preceded by: Henry King Stanford
- Succeeded by: Donna Shalala

Personal details
- Born: Edward Thaddeus Foote II; December 15, 1937 Milwaukee, Wisconsin, U.S.
- Died: February 15, 2016 (aged 78) Cutler Bay, Florida, U.S.
- Spouse: Roberta "Bosey" W. Fulbright 1964–2015 (her death)
- Children: 3
- Relatives: J. William Fulbright (father-in-law); Lewis Stevenson (great-uncle); Adlai Stevenson I (great-grandfather); Adlai Stevenson III (second cousin); McLean Stevenson (third cousin)
- Education: Yale University; Georgetown University Law Center
- Profession: Educator, university administrator
- Institutions: Washington University in St. Louis (dean, 1973-1980); University of Miami (president, 1981-2001)

Edward Thaddeus "Tad" Foote II (December 15, 1937 – February 15, 2016) was an American academic administrator, attorney, and journalist who served as the fourth president of the University of Miami from 1981 through 2001.

== Early life and education ==
Foote was born in Milwaukee, Wisconsin on December 15, 1937. He graduated from John Burroughs School in Ladue, Missouri. He earned a bachelor's degree from Yale University and a law degree from Georgetown University Law Center.

== Career ==
Foote served as dean of the Washington University School of Law at Washington University in St. Louis from 1973 to 1980.

=== University of Miami ===
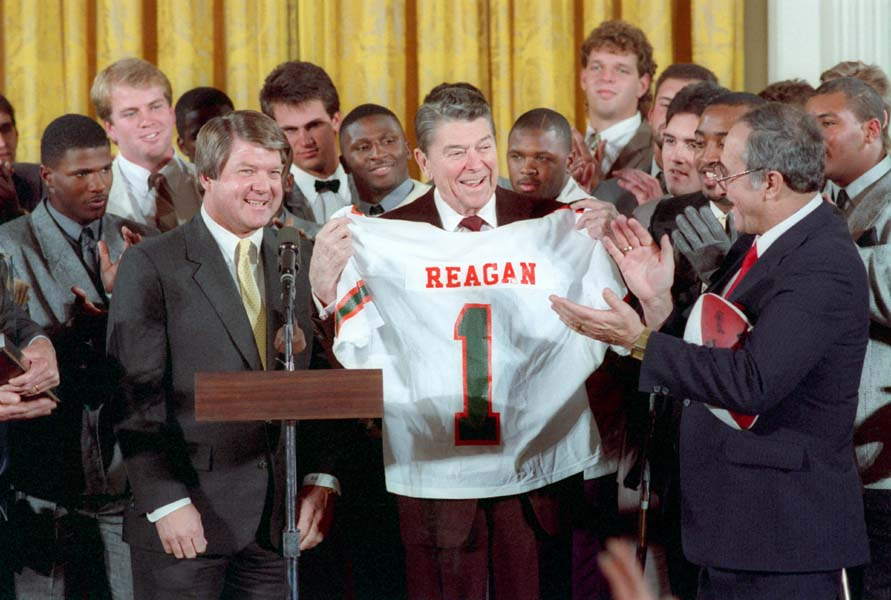
During Foote's tenure as University of Miami president, the University of Miami football team won two national championships. Following the second national championship, on January 29, 1988, then University of Miami football coach Jimmy Johnson and the 1987 Miami Hurricanes team presented President Ronald Reagan with a University of Miami jersey at The White House after winning 1987 national championship.

In March 1981, Foote succeeded Henry King Stanford as the fourth University of Miami president.

During Foote's tenure, undergraduate admissions and academic standards were raised, top faculty recruited, and major private and government funding secured for research and permanent facilities. The increase in the university's local, national and international profile paralleled the rise of Miami as the so-called "Capital of the Americas".

Foote's tenure as University of Miami president included a capital fundraising campaign that was the second-largest in the history of American higher education at the time, raising $517.5 million; purchasing or constructing nearly 50 buildings; and bolstering the academic quality of admitted students. In 1982, Foote pared undergraduate enrollment by 2,500 to 8,500, raising standards for admissions and improving retention and graduation rates by targeting a smaller but more selective student body.

By fall 2000, entering students had an average SAT score of 1200, about 100 points higher than the class of 1981. Today, the university's mean SAT score is 1315.

Foote also launched a steadily-increasing amount of sponsored research conducted by University of Miami professors and scientists. In 2000, $193.9 million was spent on research, up from $58.1 million, in 1981. Foote also created three new colleges, the School of Architecture, the School of Communication, and the Graduate School of International Studies, and increased the number of full-time faculty members by 560, and championed the university's athletic program. Under his presidency, the University of Miami won four NCAA Division I national championships in college football and three College World Series baseball titles. He also reinstated the men's basketball program.

Foote was a member of the Non-Group, a civically influential group of Miami-Dade business elites.

== Honors ==
The University of Miami established the Foote Fellowships in honor of the university's fourth president. In 2003, Foote was elected to Common Cause's national governing board. Foote was inducted into the Iron Arrow Honor Society, the highest honor bestowed by the University of Miami.

== Personal life ==
Foote was married to Roberta "Bosey" Fulbright Foote, who died in May 2015. She was born December 27, 1938, in Arkansas and was the daughter of the late U.S. senator, J. William Fulbright. They had three children and eight grandchildren. On his maternal grandmother's side, Foote's great-grandfather was Adlai Stevenson I, the U.S. vice president from 1893 to 1897 under U.S. president Grover Cleveland, making him second cousins with Stevenson I's great-grandson former U.S. Senator Adlai Stevenson III and third cousins with Stevenson I's great-great-nephew M*A*S*H actor McLean Stevenson.

== Death ==
Foote died on February 15, 2016, at the age of 78 from complications of Parkinson's disease at East Ridge nursing facility in Cutler Bay, Florida. Former University of Miami president Donna Shalala wrote in an email, "He was a remarkable leader and a real gentleman. The University improved greatly under his tenure." Then University of Miami president Julio Frenk, told the Miami Herald, "President Foote’s tenure...was marked by a far-reaching and rigorous pursuit of academic excellence that helped to distinguish our students and faculty among the finest in the nation. Together with his late wife, Roberta "Bosey" Fulbright Foote, they made Miami their home, and we are a far better and stronger institution and community thanks to them."
