= Bobby Dodd Coach of the Year Award =

American college football award

- Awarded for: Division I FBS head coach whose team excels on the field, in the classroom and in the community.
- Location: Chattanooga, Tennessee
- Country: United States
- Presented by: Peach Bowl (The selection is done by a committee of college football experts.)

History
- First award: 1976
- Most recent: Curt Cignetti, Indiana (2025)
- Website: http://www.thedoddtrophy.com/

The Bobby Dodd Coach of the Year Award is an annual college football award given to the Division I Football Bowl Subdivision head coach whose team excels on the field, in the classroom, and in the community. The award is named for Bobby Dodd, longtime head football coach at Georgia Tech and was established in 1976 to honor the values that Dodd exemplified. Award recipients are chosen by a selection committee composed of college football experts and all previous recipients. The recipient is announced during halftime of the Chick-fil-A Peach Bowl in Atlanta. A formal presentation is held later, usually on the university campus of the recipient. Winners from the previous two seasons, as well as coaches in their first year at their current programs, are ineligible for the award.

== Winners ==
Two coaches have won the award twice: Bill Snyder of Kansas State University, won in 1998 and again in 2012, and Joe Paterno of Penn State who received the award in 1981 and again in 2005. Nine schools have had two different coaches given the award: Alabama with Bill Curry in 1989 and Nick Saban in 2014, Michigan with Bo Schembechler in 1977 and Lloyd Carr in 2007, Air Force with Ken Hatfield in 1983 and Fisher DeBerry in 1985, Georgia Tech with Bobby Ross in 1990 and George O'Leary in 2000, Northwestern with Gary Barnett in 1995 and Pat Fitzgerald in 2020, TCU with Jim Wacker in 1984 and Gary Patterson in 2009, Duke with Fred Goldsmith in 1994 and David Cutcliffe in 2013, the Florida State Seminoles with Bobby Bowden in 1980 and Mike Norvell in 2023, and the Notre Dame Fighting Irish with Brian Kelly in 2018 and Marcus Freeman in 2024.

Year	Coach	School
1976	Vince Dooley	Georgia
1977	Bo Schembechler	Michigan
1978	Tom Osborne	Nebraska
1979	LaVell Edwards	BYU
1980	Bobby Bowden	Florida State
1981	Joe Paterno	Penn State
1982	George MacIntyre	Vanderbilt
1983	Ken Hatfield	Air Force
1984	Jim Wacker	TCU
1985	Fisher DeBerry	Air Force
1986	Dick Sheridan	North Carolina State
1987	Dick MacPherson	Syracuse
1988	Don Nehlen	West Virginia
1989	Bill Curry	Alabama
1990	Bobby Ross	Georgia Tech
1991	George Welsh	Virginia
1992	Eddie Robinson	Grambling State
1993	Barry Alvarez	Wisconsin
1994	Fred Goldsmith	Duke
1995	Gary Barnett	Northwestern
1996	Bob Sutton	Army
1997	Mike Price	Washington State
1998	Bill Snyder	Kansas State
1999	Frank Beamer	Virginia Tech
2000	George O'Leary	Georgia Tech
2001	Ralph Friedgen	Maryland
2002	Jim Tressel	Ohio State
2003	Bob Stoops	Oklahoma
2004	Paul Johnson	Navy
2005	Joe Paterno (2)	Penn State
2006	Jim Grobe	Wake Forest
2007	Lloyd Carr	Michigan
2008	Mack Brown	Texas
2009	Gary Patterson	TCU
2010	Chris Petersen	Boise State
2011	Dabo Swinney	Clemson
2012	Bill Snyder (2)	Kansas State
2013	David Cutcliffe	Duke
2014	Nick Saban	Alabama
2015	Kirk Ferentz	Iowa
2016	Mike MacIntyre	Colorado
2017	David Shaw	Stanford
2018	Brian Kelly	Notre Dame
2019	Kyle Whittingham	Utah
2020	Pat Fitzgerald	Northwestern
2021	Luke Fickell	Cincinnati
2022	Willie Fritz	Tulane
2023	Mike Norvell	Florida State
2024	Marcus Freeman	Notre Dame
2025	Curt Cignetti	Indiana
