= Charles Boynton Knapp =

American academic

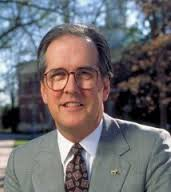

President Emeritus of the University of Georgia
- In office 1987–1997
- Preceded by: Henry King Stanford
- Succeeded by: Michael F. Adams

Personal details
- Born: August 13, 1946 (age 79) Ames, Iowa, U.S.
- Education: Iowa State University (BS); University of Wisconsin-Madison (MA, PhD)

Charles Boynton Knapp (born August 13, 1946) was the president of the University of Georgia (UGA) in Athens, Georgia, United States. He served in that capacity from 1987 until his resignation in 1997.

== Early life and education ==
Knapp was born in Ames, Iowa, on August 13, 1946. He received a bachelor's degree (B.S.) with honors and distinction from Iowa State University in 1968. While at Iowa State, Knapp joined the Iowa Gamma chapter of Phi Delta Theta fraternity.

He earned a combined master's degree (M.A.) and doctoral degree (Ph.D.) in economics from the University of Wisconsin–Madison in 1972.

== Academic and professional career ==
From 1972–1976, Knapp taught economics at the University of Texas at Austin. He then left academia from 1977-1979 to serve as Special Assistant to the Secretary of Labor in Washington, D.C., and, subsequently, Deputy Assistant Secretary of Labor from 1979 until 1981.

Returning to academia, Knapp became Associate Professor of Public Policy at George Washington University from 1981 to 1982. He moved to Tulane University in 1982 and continued teaching economics. He then became Executive Vice President of Tulane in 1985 and served in that capacity until accepting the UGA presidency in 1987. At that time, Knapp was the youngest president of any of the nation's major research universities.

During his presidency, Knapp was a founding member of the Georgia Research Alliance and was instrumental in the creation of the HOPE Scholarship. He chaired the board of directors of the National Association of State Universities and Land Grant Colleges and served on the National School-to-Work Advisory Council.

Upon leaving UGA, Knapp became president of the Aspen Institute in Washington, D.C., and joined Heidrick & Struggles as a partner in their higher education practice. He also was appointed to the American Council on Education and the Association of Governing Boards of Universities and Colleges.

== Legacy ==
Construction projects totaling more than $400 million were started during his administration, including the Biological Sciences Complex (1992), Ramsey Student Center for Physical Activities (1995), the Performing Arts Center, Hodgson Hall (1996), the music building (1996), the Georgia Museum of Art (1996), Rusk Hall (1996), and the UGA Welcome Center (1996).

Knapp was awarded the Distinguished Achievement Award by the Iowa State University Alumni Association in 1994. In 2004, Knapp was named president emeritus of UGA by the Georgia Board of Regents.

In 2005, Knapp joined UGA’s Institute of Higher Education as a part-time Distinguished Public Service Fellow and professor of economics in The University of Georgia's Terry College of Business.

In 2013, Knapp was named interim dean of UGA's Terry College of Business.

Knapp currently serves as a member of the Board of Trustees at Oglethorpe University in Atlanta, Georgia.

== Sources ==
- From Ahmedunggar to Lavonia Presidents at the University of Georgia 1785-1997, University of Georgia Libraries, Hargrett Rare Book and Manuscript Library Archived 2006-08-31 at the Wayback Machine Retrieved May 18, 2006.
- Charles Knapp receives president emeritus designation, Columns faculty staff newspaper, UGA Office of Public Affairs, October 4, 2004 Retrieved May 18, 2006.
- Charles Knapp, former president, will join university’s Institute of Higher Education, Columns faculty staff newspaper, UGA Office of Public Affairs, February 25, 2005 Retrieved May 18, 2006.
- UGA Institute of Higher Education faculty page Retrieved May 18, 2006.
- Georgia Senate Resolution 160 commending Dr. Charles B. Knapp Retrieved May 18, 2006.
- Distinguished Achievement Award Winners, Iowa State Alumni Association Retrieved May 18, 2006.

== Notes ==
1. William Prokasy, UGA's Vice-President of Academic Affairs at the time, served as the interim UGA president for 3 months from the time of Knapp's departure in the spring of 1997 until Michael Adams official start in the fall of that same year.

Preceded by Henry King Stanford	President of the University of Georgia; 1987–1997	Succeeded by Michael F. Adams
