= Henry King Stanford =

19th President of the University of Georgia
- In office 1986–1987
- Preceded by: Frederick Corbet Davison
- Succeeded by: Charles Boynton Knapp

3rd President of the University of Miami
- In office 1962 – March 1981
- Preceded by: Jay F. W. Pearson
- Succeeded by: Edward T. Foote II

President of Georgia Southwestern College
- In office 1948–1950

Personal details
- Born: April 22, 1916 Atlanta, Georgia, U.S.
- Died: January 1, 2009 (aged 92) Americus, Georgia, U.S.
- Education: Emory University (A.B.); University of Denver (M.Sc.); New York University (PhD)
- Profession: Educator, university administrator

Henry King Stanford (April 22, 1916 – January 1, 2009) was the interim president of the University of Georgia (UGA) from 1986 through 1987 and the third president of the University of Miami from 1962 to 1981.

== Early life and education ==
Stanford attended Emory University, where he obtained a A.B., the University of Denver, where he earned a M.Sc., and New York University, where he earned a PhD.

== Career ==
He was a university professor at Emory University and Georgia Institute of Technology (Georgia Tech).

He then served as director of the School of Public Administration at the University of Denver, president of Georgia Southwestern College, which is now Georgia Southwestern State University from 1948 to 1950, as president of Georgia State College for Women, now known as Georgia College & State University, from 1953 to 1956, and as president of Birmingham–Southern College from 1957 to 1962.

=== University of Miami ===
In 1962, he was appointed the third president of the University of Miami, and served in that role until 1981. From 1986 to 1987, he served as interim president of the University of Georgia.

== Awards and honorary degrees ==
Stanford received 13 honorary degrees and received several awards, including the Eleanor Roosevelt-Israel Humanitarian Award, the "Star of Africa" medal, and the Officer’s Cross of the Order of Merit of the Federal Republic of Germany. He was vice president of the International Association of University Presidents, and was on the board of trustees of the Knight Foundation and several corporate boards.

Stanford received the regional Brotherhood Award of the National Conference of Christians and Jews, and also received awards from the Anti-Defamation League. The Georgia Board of Regents named him president emeritus of the University of Georgia.

== Retirement and death ==
In 1988, at the age of 72, Stanford climbed Mount Everest. On January 1, 2009, he died at the age of 92 at his home in Americus, Georgia.
