= Frederick Corbet Davison =

President of the University of Georgia
- In office 1967–1986
- Preceded by: Omer Clyde Aderhold
- Succeeded by: Henry King Stanford

Personal details
- Born: September 3, 1929 Atlanta, Georgia
- Died: April 28, 2004 (aged 74) Augusta, Georgia
- Education: Emory University; University of Georgia (DVM); Iowa State University (PhD)

Frederick Corbet "Fred" Davison (September 3, 1929 – April 28, 2004) was the President of the University of Georgia (UGA) in Athens. He served in that capacity from 1967 until his resignation in 1986.

== Early life and education ==
Davison attended Oxford College of Emory University before transferring to UGA in 1948 to earn his veterinary degree (D.V.M.) from UGA in 1952. Dr. Davison met his wife, Dianne Castle, while in vet school. She also obtained her D.V.M from UGA in 1952.

After receiving their veterinary degrees, Dianne and Fred Davison opened a veterinary practice in Fred Davison's hometown of Marietta, Georgia. In 1958, the Davisons went to Iowa State University where Fred earned his doctorate (Ph.D.) in Biochemistry and Pathology, and Dianne worked as a researcher.

He then taught veterinary science at Iowa State University while also leading a U.S. Atomic Energy Commission research project on stable rare earth compounds.

== Academic and professional career ==
Davison worked for the American Veterinary Medical Association as the assistant director of the Scientific Activities Division for a year before being named dean of the UGA College of Veterinary Medicine in 1964. In 1966, he became vice chancellor of the University System of Georgia and the following year was named president of UGA.

Davison served as president until his resignation in 1986 following a successful lawsuit against the University by UGA English teacher Jan Kemp. Kemp claimed that University administrators fired her in retaliation for protesting preferential treatment for athletes in UGA's developmental studies program.

Following his retirement as president, Dr. Davison remained on the UGA veterinary faculty for two years. From 1988-2002, he served as president and chief executive officer of the National Science Center Foundation, Inc., in Augusta until his retirement in 2002. Dr. Davison also chaired the board of directors of Citizens for Nuclear Technology Awareness (CTNA).

== Death and legacy ==
On April 28, 2004, Fred Davison died from esophageal cancer in Augusta, Georgia and was buried in Oconee Hill Cemetery in Athens.

Accomplishments during Davison's presidency include:

- Funding from research contracts and grants climbed from less than $7 million to more than $27 million during his presidency
- The University budget tripled
- Enrollment rose in all but two years while he was president, climbing from 15,600 to 25,000
- He conferred more than 106,000 degrees, more than the total conferred by all 16 of his predecessors
- The number of faculty increased from 1,150 to 1,850 during his administration
- Funding from research contracts and grants increased
- Graduate enrollment doubled, and the number of doctoral degrees awarded annually rose significantly
- In 1980, UGA was designated as the 15th Sea Grant institution
- The School of Environmental Design was established (joined with the Institute of Ecology in 2001 to become the College of Environment & Design)
- Creation of the Rusk Center for International and Comparative Law (named for former U.S. Secretary of State Dean Rusk, a Davison recruit to the UGA law faculty)
- Creation of the Rural Development Center, the Small Business Development Center, and the Center for Global Policy Studies
- In the 1970s UGA ranked in five national surveys as one of the top 50 research institutions in the country.
- Laid the foundation for the Life Sciences Building, a $32 million, 257,000-square-foot (23,900 m^{2}) structure that houses the genetics and biochemistry departments (renamed Fred C. Davison Life Sciences Complex in April 2004)
- At his retirement as UGA president, alumni and friends contributed about $900,000 to endow the Fred C. Davison Professorship, an endowed chair in the UGA College of Veterinary Medicine

The following buildings were opened on the UGA campus during Davison's tenure:

- Alexander Campbell King Law Library (1967)
- Boyd Graduate Studies/Science Library Research Center (1968)
- Psychology/Journalism Complex (1968)
- University Bookstore (1968)
- State Botanical Garden (1969 – 1985)
- Aderhold Hall (1971)
- Miller Plant Sciences Building (1972)
- Family Housing Extension (1972 – 1974)
- Ecology building (1974)
- Library Annex (1974)
- Henry Feild Tennis Stadium (1977)
- Caldwell Hall (1981)
- Law Annex (1981)
- Tate Student Center (1983)
- Second deck added to Sanford Stadium (1967)
- Enclosure of the east end of Sanford Stadium (1981)

Other notable facts/honors:

- Served as Boy Scouts of America Georgia-Carolina Council President
- Citizens for Nuclear Technology Awareness annually awards the Fred C. Davison Distinguished Scientist Award to honor scientists or engineers from the Savannah River Site (SRS) whose lifetime scientific contributions have been exceptional
- American Veterinary Medical Foundation Honor Roll Member

== Notes ==
Preceded by Omer Clyde Aderhold	President of the University of Georgia; 1967–1986	Succeeded by Henry King Stanford
