= Michael F. Adams =

American academic administrator (1948–2026)

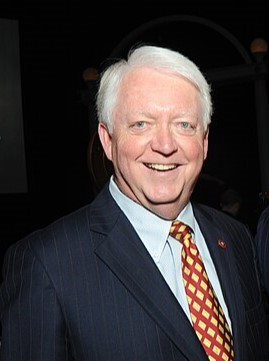
- Adams in 2013

21st President of the University of Georgia
- In office September 1, 1997 – June 30, 2013
- Preceded by: Charles Boynton Knapp
- Succeeded by: Jere Morehead

19th President of Centre College
- In office April 3, 1989 – June 1997
- Preceded by: Richard L. Morrill
- Succeeded by: John A. Roush

Personal details
- Born: March 25, 1948 Montgomery, Alabama, U.S.
- Died: January 25, 2026 (aged 77)
- Party: Republican
- Spouse: Mary Lynn Ethridge (m. 1969)
- Education: David Lipscomb College (BA); Ohio State University (MA, PhD)

Michael Fred Adams (March 25, 1948 – January 25, 2026) was an American political staffer, educator, and academic administrator.

Born in Montgomery, Alabama, Adams began his career as a staffer for Senate minority leader Howard Baker, including three years as Baker's chief of staff. After an unsuccessful run for the House of Representatives in 1980, he worked as a senior advisor to Governor of Tennessee Lamar Alexander. His first foray into academia was as a professor and the vice president for university affairs at Pepperdine University, where he remained until 1989. That year, he took the presidency of Centre College in Danville, Kentucky, which he held until 1997. At Centre, he added several degree programs, completed a $60 million fundraiser, renovated and improved many buildings on campus, and tripled the school's endowment. He applied for the presidency of the University of Georgia (UGA) on the last day to apply and was ultimately selected for the job. He was announced as UGA's twenty-first president in June 1997 and took office that September.

Adams's presidency at UGA was not without controversy. Shortly into his term, he reduced the number of senior vice presidents from seven to three and his own expenses prompted an audit. His disagreement with athletic director Vince Dooley and Adams's subsequent refusal to extend Dooley's contract was unpopular among many. A poll among faculty from the largest of the university's colleges also showed that a majority of that college's faculty lacked confidence in his administration. His presidency saw significant growth for the university, however; enrollment grew to 35,000 students and the endowment nearly tripled. Five new colleges were created, and UGA athletics won nineteen national championships and saw their revenue nearly quadruple. He resigned as UGA president in May 2012 and left office in July 2013. He was later named chancellor at Pepperdine, a position he held from August 2015 to July 2018.

== Early life and education ==
Michael Fred Adams was born on March 25, 1948, in Montgomery, Alabama, to Jean and Hubert Adams. He was raised Christian as a member of the Church of Christ. In his youth, he moved with his family to Atlanta, Albany, and Macon, Georgia, and then to Chattanooga, Tennessee, following his father's work at Kraft Foods Inc.. He graduated from Chattanooga High School.

Adams was the first member of his family to attend college. He attended David Lipscomb College—now Lipscomb University—for his undergraduate studies, graduating magna cum laude with a degree in speech and history in 1970. Afterward, he earned a Master of Arts in communication research methodologies and a Doctorate in communications, both with a concentration in educational administration, from Ohio State University in 1971 and 1973, respectively. After graduating from Ohio State, where he was named a University Fellow, he completed a postdoc at Oxford University.

== Career ==
=== Political work and Pepperdine, 1974–1988 ===
Adams's first career experience was in politics; he worked as a staffer for Howard Baker, the Senate minority leader, from 1974 to 1979. The last three years of his time working for Baker was as his chief of staff. Adams was the Republican nominee for Congress in Tennessee's 5th congressional district but lost the general election to the incumbent Democratic representative Bill Boner. From 1980 to 1982, Adams was a senior advisor to Lamar Alexander, then the governor of Tennessee, specifically as the deputy commissioner of economic and community development.

Adams left Alexander's staff to accept a position as the vice president for university affairs at Pepperdine University. During this time, he was also a member of the Pepperdine faculty as a professor of political communication.

=== Centre College, 1989–1997 ===
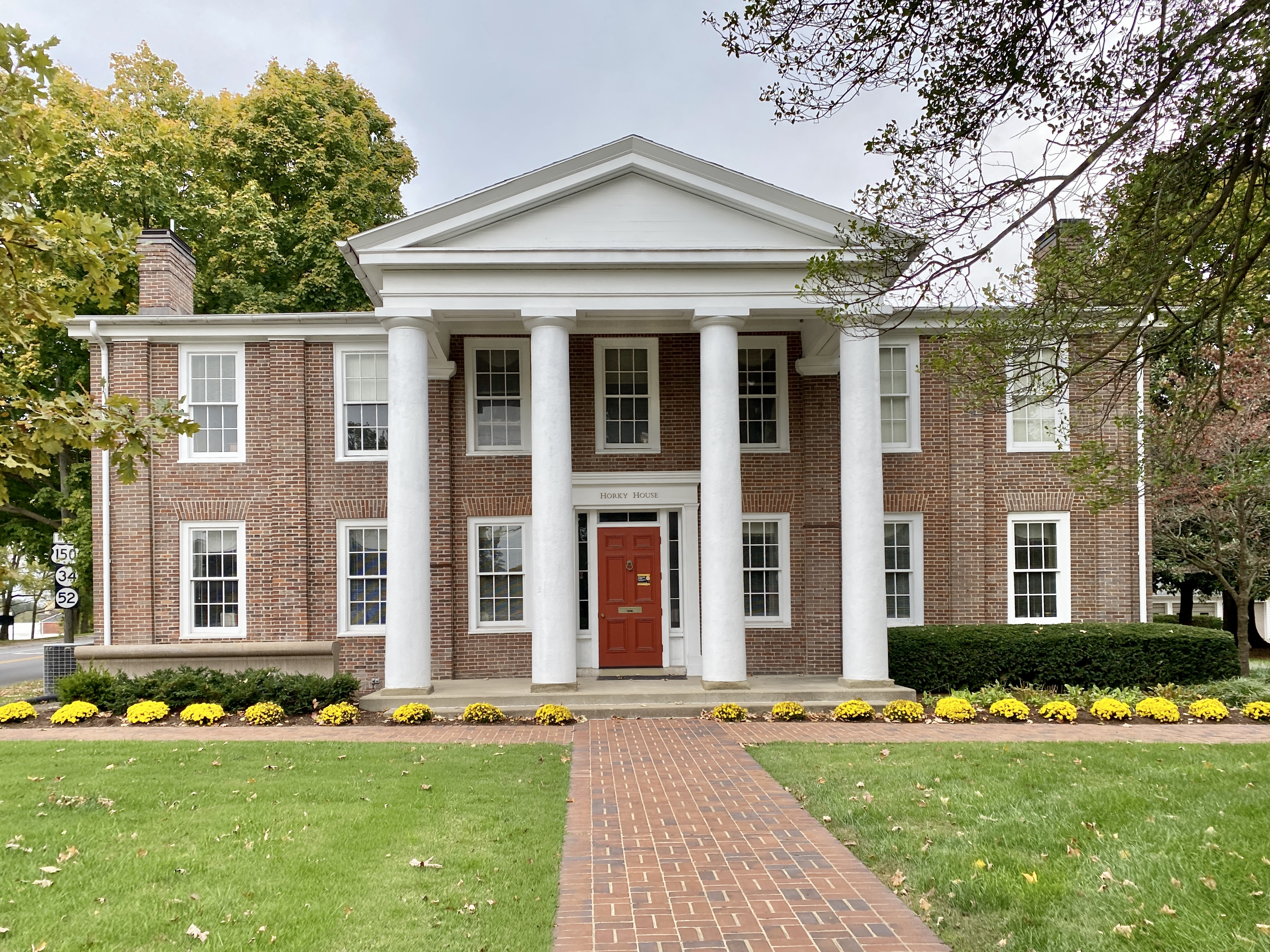
Horky House (pictured in 2021) was converted during Adams's presidency at Centre to house the admissions office.

Adams was named the nineteenth president of Centre College, in Danville, Kentucky, in December 1988, and he took office on April 3, 1989. He was Centre's first non-Presbyterian president.

Adams expanded and improved Centre's campus and offerings both in Kentucky and abroad. Old Centre, the Carnegie Library, Horky House, and Combs Warehouse underwent renovation during his tenure. Greek Row was established; chapter houses were built for sororities for the first time and fraternities received newly built houses the following year. The former fraternity houses were converted into new dormitory buildings, named after Centre alumni and important figures in the history of the college, including Cooper Hall (for U.S. Senator John Sherman Cooper), Vinson Hall (for Chief Justice Fred Vinson), Ganfield Hall (for Centre President William Arthur Ganfield), and Stevenson Hall (for U.S. Vice President Adlai Stevenson I). Study abroad programs in London, Strasbourg, and Mérida were also established. The college added multiple degree offerings, including anthropology and sociology, computer science, and classics. Fundraising was also a major emphasis of Adams's administration; Centre received multiple large research initiative grants from the Howard Hughes Medical Institute and the National Science Foundation, respectively, and outraised a $60 million goal as part of their Front and Centre fundraising campaign. Over Adams's tenure as president, Centre's endowment tripled to a total in excess of $120 million. Additionally, Centre became the top college in the country by the percentage of its alumni to donate.

The John C. Young Honors Program, named in honor of Centre's fourth president John C. Young, was established in 1989 to provide support for a group of seniors in research projects of their choice. Access to the Internet was first established on campus at Centre in 1993, the same year that the faculty split from the College Council, which had previously comprised the whole faculty and a selection of students and staff, to become its own separate body.

Adams attracted some disdain from the faculty at Centre after he made changes to the faculty handbook, a move that violated college policy. As a result, a selection of faculty began what the historian Rich Whitt described as a "quiet revolt". Several Centre professors reported that tension between faculty and administration grew significantly under Adams.

While president of Centre, Adams held numerous leadership roles at various organizations. These included periods as a vice chair on the National Collegiate Athletic Association Presidents Commission, the Board of the National Association of Independent Colleges and Universities, the Board of the American Council on Education, the Board of the Kentucky Center for Public Issues, Leadership Kentucky, and the Executive Council of the Southern Association of Colleges and Schools. He helped to reorganize, and was the first president of, the Southern Collegiate Athletic Conference, of which Centre was a member.

=== University of Georgia, 1997–2013 ===
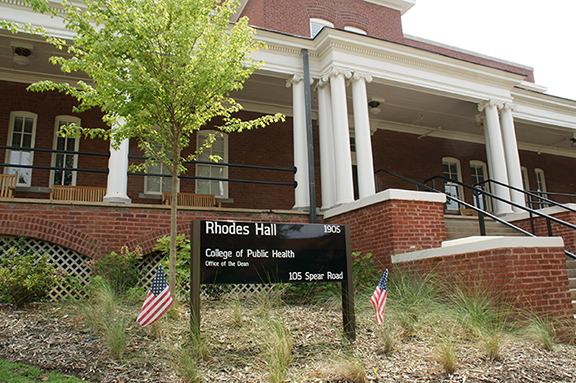
Rhodes Hall (pictured in 2014) housed the administrative offices of the new UGA College of Public Health beginning in 2013.

Adams applied for the presidency at the University of Georgia (UGA), left vacant by the resignation of Chuck Knapp in 1996. He was one of three finalists for the position, along with University of Michigan vice president Bernie Machen and North Carolina State University vice provost Debra W. Stewart. Ultimately, he was selected, and he was announced as UGA's incoming president on June 11, 1997, which surprised many UGA faculty and students due to Adams's lack of experience in leadership at flagship universities. He resigned from Centre effective around that same time and took office as UGA's twenty-first president on September 1, 1997. At Georgia, his starting annual salary was $177,000, though he was making upwards of $1 million by the time of his retirement.

Shortly into his tenure at Georgia, Adams shrank the school's staff of seven senior vice presidents to three, creating a provost position that would be filled by Karen Holbrook, formerly vice provost for research at University of Florida. In 2002, Adams announced to the UGA Foundation that he had a job offer for the presidency of Ohio State University—with a supposed salary of between $850,000 and $1,000,000—leading the Foundation to offer him a raise. After reading published reports of the alleged offer James Patterson, chair of Ohio State's presidential search committee, "flatly denied" that Adams was offered the position.

In July 2003, the university underwent an audit from Deloitte & Touche to investigate issues including Adams's expenses. Those concerning travel and payments to his wife were put under particular scrutiny. These expenses included a trip to watch George W. Bush's inauguration, a commencement reception for a graduating law school class which included Adams's son, and a trip to attend the funeral of Robert L. McLeod, who had been president of Centre from 1938 to 1945. Auditors noted that Adams later reimbursed the foundation for some of these expenses. Disagreement between Adams and longtime athletic director and former football coach Vince Dooley led to Dooley's retirement after his contract was not renewed, a move that drew ire from many.

In March 2004, in the wake of these scandals, the faculty senate of the Franklin College of Arts and Sciences, the largest college in the University of Georgia, passed a vote of "no confidence" in Adams. The senate's statement argued for an "erosion in excellence" during his tenure. Around this time, the UGA Foundation announced that it would no longer provide Adams with additional annual compensation of over $300,000, but would instead donate to the UGA general fund. In July 2010, athletic director Damon Evans, whom Adams hired to replace Dooley, was arrested for DUI and resigned as a result. In spite of the scandals that took place within the Georgia athletic department during Adams's tenure, which also included NCAA violations for academic fraud that took place under the watch of head men's basketball coach Jim Harrick, UGA teams won nineteen national championships and athletic department revenue grew from $25.7 million to a projected $92.1 million.

During Adams's presidency, UGA established five new colleges: the School of Public and International Affairs and the College of Environment & Design in 2001, the College of Public Health in 2005, the Odum School of Ecology in 2007, and the College of Engineering in 2012. This was the conclusion of a plan that initially included the dissolution of the Grady College of Journalism, though protest from faculty and students ultimately forced Adams to scrap that portion of the project. Adams was named vice president of the executive committee of the Southeastern Conference (SEC) for the 2003–2004 academic year under committee president John A. White, the chancellor of the University of Arkansas. Thereafter, Adams served for two years as the committee's president in his own right. After the end of his term in 2006, he was elected to a two-year term as the chairman of the National Collegiate Athletic Association Executive Committee. During this time, he attracted attention by publicly announcing his support for an eight-team playoff championship system for college football.

During Adams's presidency, UGA's enrollment grew from just under 30,000 to about 35,000 and the school raised more money than it had in its history up to that point. UGA's endowment also grew, from $250 million to $745 million, and it more than doubled its number of endowed professorships to 219. In Adams's final ten years, the university was ranked in the top twenty public research universities by U.S. News & World Report eight times. Adams announced his resignation as UGA president on May 3, 2012, set to be effective June 30, 2013. He was succeeded by UGA provost Jere Morehead. Upon departing Georgia, Adams and his wife continued to maintain a residence in Athens. He was designated president emeritus and Regents' professor by the university upon leaving office.

=== Post-presidency, 2013–2018 ===
After leaving Georgia, Adams returned to Pepperdine for a three-year term as the university's chancellor from August 1, 2015, to July 31, 2018. He was the second-ranking member of the school's administration and worked directly for university president Andrew K. Benton, whom Adams first hired during his first stint at Pepperdine.

== Personal life and death ==
Adams married Mary Lynn Ethridge on June 7, 1969, in Union City, Tennessee, and they had two children. He died on January 25, 2026, at the age of 77.

Academic offices
Preceded by Richard L. Morrill	President of Centre College; April 3, 1989 — June 1997	Succeeded by John A. Roush
Preceded by Charles Boynton Knapp	President of the University of Georgia; September 1, 1997 — June 30, 2013	Succeeded by Jere Morehead
Preceded by Charles B. Runnels	Chancellor of Pepperdine University; August 1, 2015 — July 31, 2018	Succeeded by Sara Young Jackson
Other offices
Preceded by John Palms as President of the University of South Carolina	Vice President of the Southeastern Conference Executive Committee; July 1, 2003 — June 30, 2004	Succeeded by Andrew Sorensen as President of the University of South Carolina
Preceded by John A. White as Chancellor of the University of Arkansas	President of the Southeastern Conference Executive Committee; July 1, 2004 — June 30, 2006	Succeeded by Andrew Sorensen as President of the University of South Carolina
Preceded by Walter Harrison as President of the University of Hartford	Chairman of the NCAA Executive Committee; 2007 — 2009	Succeeded by Ed Ray as President of Oregon State University
