= Kirby Smart =

American football player and coach

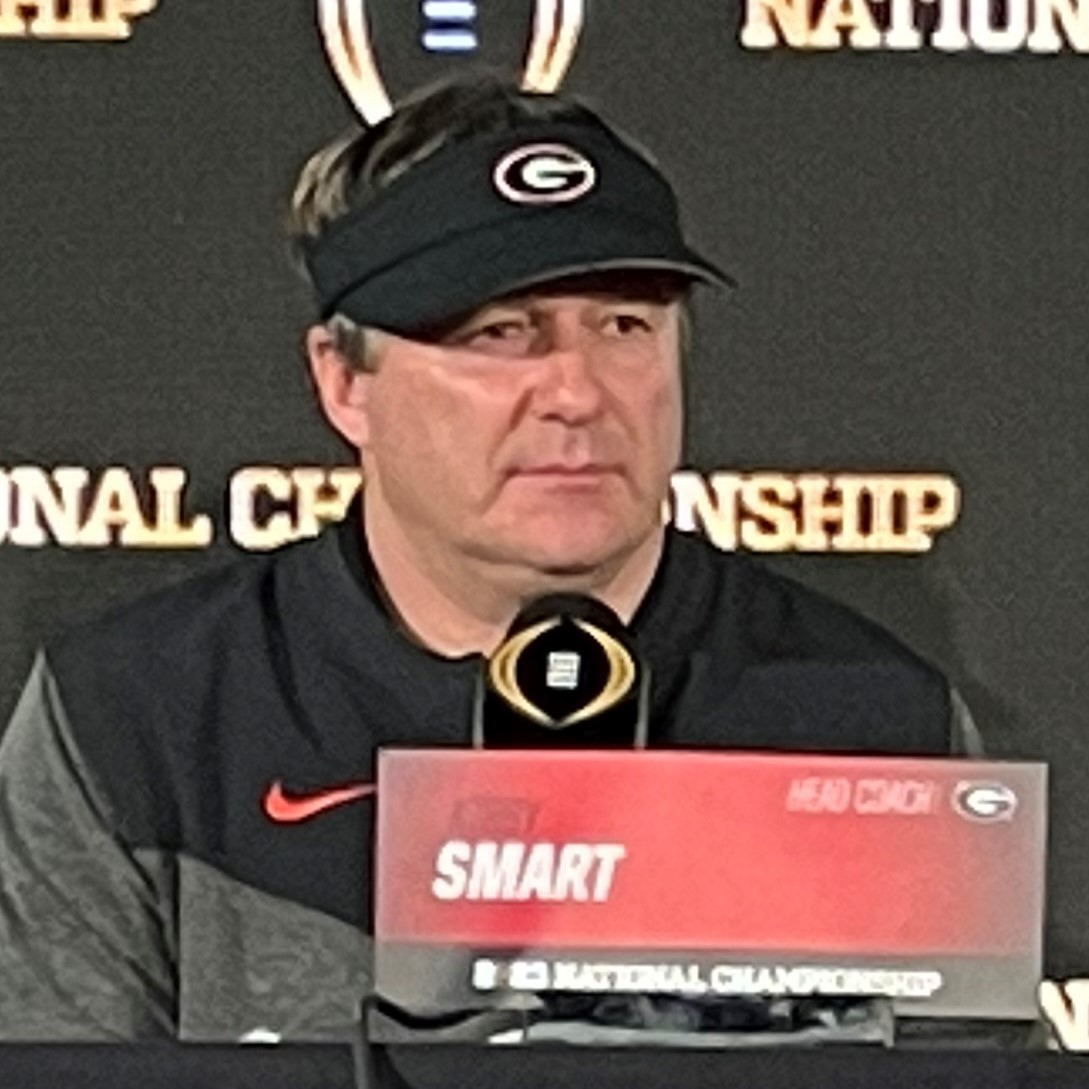
- Smart in 2023

Georgia Bulldogs
- Title: Head coach

Personal information
- Born: December 23, 1975 (age 50); Montgomery, Alabama, U.S.
- Listed height: 5 ft 11 in (1.80 m)

Career information
- Position: Defensive back
- High school: Bainbridge (Bainbridge, Georgia)
- College: Georgia (1995–1998)
- NFL draft: 1999: undrafted

Career history

Playing
- Indianapolis Colts (1999)*
- * Offseason or practice squad member only

Coaching
- Georgia (1999) Administrative assistant; Valdosta State (2000) Defensive backs coach; Valdosta State (2001) Defensive coordinator; Florida State (2002–2003) Graduate assistant; LSU (2004) Defensive backs coach; Georgia (2005) Running backs coach; Miami Dolphins (2006) Safeties coach; Alabama (2007) Assistant head coach / defensive backs coach; Alabama (2008–2015) Defensive coordinator; Georgia (2016–present) Head coach

Awards and highlights
- Playing: First-team All-SEC (1998); Second-team All-SEC (1997); Coaching: 2× National champion (2021, 2022); 4× SEC champion (2017, 2022, 2024, 2025); 6× SEC East Division champion (2017–2019, 2021–2023); 3× SEC Coach of the Year (2017, 2021, 2022); As an assistant coach: 4× National champion (2009, 2011, 2012, 2015); 5× SEC champion (2005, 2009, 2012, 2014, 2015); Broyles Award (2009); AFCA Assistant Coach of the Year (2012)

Head coaching record
- Regular season: 118–18 (.868)
- Postseason: 9–4 (.692)
- Career: 127–22 (.852)

Kirby Paul Smart is an American football coach and former player. He is the current head football coach at the University of Georgia, his alma mater. As head coach, he led the Bulldogs to back to back national championships in 2021 and 2022.

== Early life ==
Smart was born on December 23, 1975, Montgomery, Alabama, to Sonny and Sharon Smart, and grew up in Bainbridge, Georgia. He has a brother, Karl and a sister, Kendall. His father, Sonny Smart, was a high school football coach and coached Smart in high school. Smart began his playing career at Bainbridge High School and went on to play college football at the University of Georgia, where he was teammates with defensive linemen Antonio Cochran, Emarlos Leroy, linebacker Brandon Tolbert, Pro Football Hall of Fame cornerback Champ Bailey, and Super Bowl MVP Hines Ward. Smart was a four-year letterman at defensive back for Georgia and a first-team All-SEC selection as a senior. He finished his career with 13 interceptions, which ranked fourth all-time at Georgia, and led the Bulldogs with six interceptions in 1997 and five in 1998. He was also a four-time member of the SEC Academic Honor Roll. Smart graduated from the Terry College of Business in 1998 with a bachelor's degree in finance. He was a member of Sigma Alpha Epsilon’s Georgia Beta Chapter at the University of Georgia. He went undrafted in the 1999 NFL draft and signed a free-agent contract with the Indianapolis Colts. He spent the 1999 preseason with the team but was cut before the start of the regular season. In 2003, Kirby attended Florida State University for graduate school.

== Coaching career ==
=== Early career ===
Smart began his coaching career with the University of Georgia in 1999, serving as an administrative assistant. He moved to Valdosta State where he spent one season as defensive backs coach before being promoted to defensive coordinator for the 2001 season. From 2002 to 2003, Smart worked as a graduate assistant under Bobby Bowden at Florida State while pursuing a master's degree. He received his master's degree from FSU in 2003. Smart then spent one season as defensive backs coach at LSU under head coach Nick Saban in 2004. Smart rejoined the Georgia Bulldogs football program to serve as running backs coach for the 2005 season. His only season in the NFL came in 2006, during which time he coached under Saban again, this time as the Miami Dolphins safeties coach.

=== Alabama ===
Smart followed Nick Saban to the University of Alabama in 2007. He was hired by Saban as an assistant coach on January 9. On February 27, 2008, Smart was promoted to defensive coordinator. On December 8, 2009, Smart was awarded the Broyles Award as the nation's best assistant coach. He was the first Alabama assistant coach to win the award. Alabama went on to win the BCS National Championship over Texas. Smart considered a lucrative contract to be the defensive coordinator at his alma mater, the University of Georgia but chose to stay with the Crimson Tide in early January 2010. In 2011, Smart's defense helped Alabama win another championship, beating LSU in the 2012 BCS National Championship Game. On March 27, 2012, the University of Alabama System's Board Of Trustees voted to increase Smart's salary and extend his contract. On November 20, 2012, Smart was recognized as the 2012 AFCA FBS Assistant Coach of the Year. Alabama would win another national championship, beating Notre Dame with a bruising defense. On April 16, 2013, Smart was granted a $200,000 salary increase to make him the highest-paid defensive coordinator in college football. He was part of the Alabama staff that won the National Championship over Clemson in the 2015 season.

=== Georgia ===
On December 6, 2015, Smart was announced as the 26th head football coach at the University of Georgia.

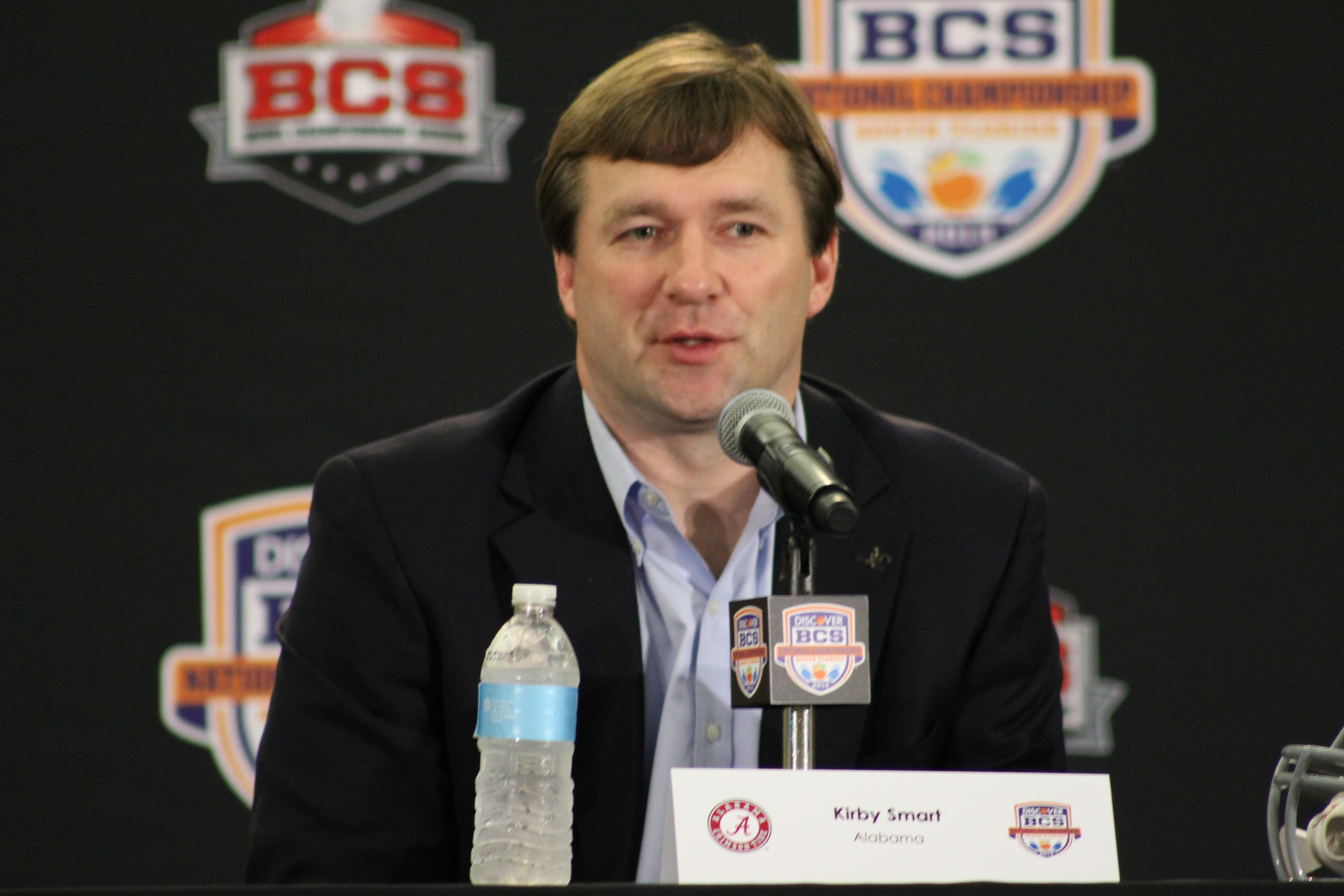
Smart with Alabama in 2013.

Smart has had six of his assistant coaches become head coaches at the FBS level: Shane Beamer for South Carolina, Sam Pittman for Arkansas, Mel Tucker for Colorado and Michigan State, Dan Lanning for Oregon, Fran Brown for Syracuse, and Dell McGee for Georgia State.

==== 2016 season ====
Smart earned his first victory as head coach of the Bulldogs in a 33–24 victory over #22 North Carolina in Georgia's first game. Smart led Georgia to a 13–7 victory over #8 Auburn on November 12. Smart went 8–5 in his first season as the head coach of the Bulldogs in 2016. The Bulldogs finished tied for second in the SEC East division. Smart's first year as Georgia's head coach ended with a 31–23 victory over TCU in the Liberty Bowl.

==== 2017 season ====
In the 2017 season, Smart led the Bulldogs to their first 9–0 start since 1982 and won the SEC East after a victory over the South Carolina Gamecocks on November 4. On December 2, 2017, Smart coached Georgia to its first SEC title since 2005, and only the fourth 12-win season in school history (1980, 2002, 2012). On December 3, Georgia was ranked No. 3 by the College Football Playoff Committee. Georgia played No. 2 Oklahoma in the College Football Playoff semifinal game at the Rose Bowl. Georgia rallied from a 31–14 first-half deficit, ultimately defeating Oklahoma 54–48 in double overtime. The Bulldogs went on to lose to Alabama in the National Championship Game 26–23, where Alabama freshman quarterback Tua Tagovailoa relieved Jalen Hurts late in the contest and ended the game on a 41-yard touchdown completion to DeVonta Smith in overtime. Smart was named SEC Coach of the Year for the 2017 season and received the George Munger Award.

==== 2018 season ====
In the 2018 season, Georgia completed the regular season with an 11–1 record. The one loss was a 36–16 defeat to #13 LSU. Georgia earned a spot in the SEC Championship game as the Eastern Division Champions, but lost to Alabama, 35–28. The No. 5 Georgia Bulldogs earned an invitation to play in the Sugar Bowl, where they lost to No. 15 Texas, 28–21.

==== 2019 season ====
In 2019, Georgia had a regular-season record of 11–1. The team recorded victories over #7 Notre Dame and #6 Florida during the season. The one loss was a 20–17 setback to South Carolina. Georgia won the SEC East for the third consecutive season, but lost to LSU in the SEC Championship game, 37–10. Georgia, ranked No. 5 entering the bowl season, beat No. 7 Baylor in the Sugar Bowl, 26–14.

==== 2020 season ====
In 2020, Georgia's regular-season record was 7–2. Georgia's two setbacks were to #2 Alabama and #8 Florida. The season was shortened because of the COVID-19 pandemic; all four games against non-SEC opponents were canceled, though Georgia played one more game than usual against SEC opponents. Georgia was slated to play ten games, but the game against Vanderbilt had to be cancelled due to COVID issues within the Commodore program. Georgia finished the regular season in second place in the SEC East. In the subsequent bowl season, the No. 9 Bulldogs beat No. 8 Cincinnati in the Peach Bowl, 24–21.

==== 2021 season ====
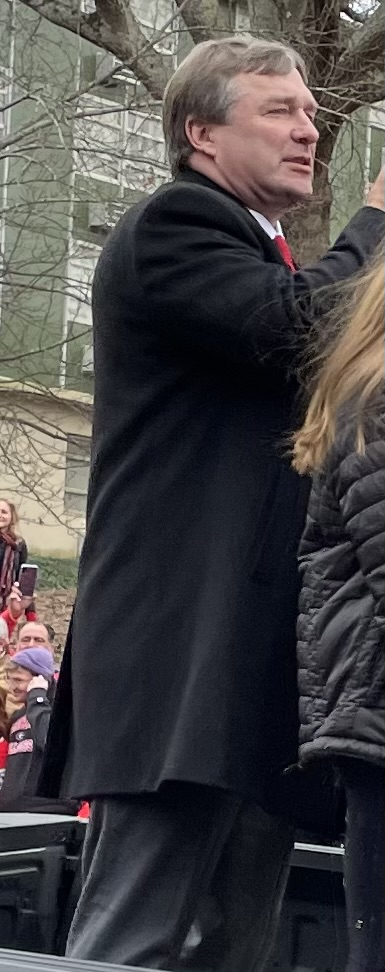
Smart celebrating at Georgia's championship parade in 2022.

In 2021, Georgia went 12–0 in the regular season. Georgia lost to Alabama in the SEC Championship, 41–24. Georgia was ranked No. 3 after this game and earned a College Football Playoff nomination. The Bulldogs defeated No. 2 Michigan in the College Football Playoff semifinal game at the Orange Bowl, 34–11. Georgia defeated No. 1 Alabama in the National Championship game, 33–18, to secure their first national championship since 1980. With this victory, Smart became the first of Saban's former assistants at Alabama and just the second overall to defeat Saban (Jimbo Fisher, a former assistant at LSU and the head coach at Texas A&M, was the first after his unranked Aggies team upset the Crimson Tide earlier in the season). Smart was named SEC Coach of the Year for the 2021 season.

==== 2022 season ====
In July 2022, Smart and Georgia agreed to a 10-year contract extension worth $112.5 million, making him the highest-paid coach in college football. Georgia started off the season with a #3 ranking in the AP Poll. The team started with a 49–3 victory over #11 Oregon. After the Oregon victory, Georgia earned the top spot in the AP Poll and reeled off seven more victories to set up an undefeated matchup against Tennessee, who was #1 in the College Football Playoff rankings and #2 in the AP Poll. Georgia defeated Tennessee 27–13. In the 2022 season, Georgia finished 12–0 once more in the regular season before defeating LSU in the SEC Championship game, 50–30. Georgia defeated Ohio State in the Peach Bowl 42–41. In the National Championship game, Georgia defeated TCU 65–7, making Kirby Smart a back-to-back national championship-winning coach, the first one since Nick Saban did so with Alabama in 2011 and 2012. Smart was named SEC Coach of the Year for the second consecutive season and the third time overall.

==== 2023 season ====
Before the beginning of 2023, Georgia was ranked #1 in both the AP and coaches polls. Following a 49–21 victory over UAB, Smart's record as head coach of Georgia increased to 85–15, which became the highest total of wins and the highest win percentage achieved by an SEC coach through their first 100 games in history. Smart additionally led the Bulldogs to an SEC-record 29-game win-streak with a 31–23 win over in-state rival Georgia Tech in Week 12 of the regular season, finishing it 12–0. The win also resulted in the most recent instance of 3-consecutive seasons of undefeated in-conference SEC play, with the second most recent also being Georgia from 1980 to 1982. The win streak ended with a loss to Alabama in the SEC Championship Game, 24–27. As a result of the loss, Georgia was not among the top four ranked teams that made the College Football Playoff, and instead played Florida State in the Orange Bowl. Georgia defeated Florida State by a score of 63–3, the largest point differential in Orange Bowl and FBS bowl game history, the latter breaking the record set in the previous year's National Championship game.

==== 2024 season ====
In May 2024, Smart and Georgia agreed to a ten-year contract extension worth $130 million, once again making him the highest-paid coach in college football history. Smart earned his 100th career win as head coach in a 30–15 victory against #1 Texas. Georgia finished with a 10–2 regular season record to qualify for the SEC Championship Game. In a rematch against Texas, he led the Bulldogs to a conference title with a 22–19 overtime win, clinching the #2-seed and a first-round bye for the College Football Playoff. In the Sugar Bowl against Notre Dame, Georgia lost 23–10.

==== 2025 season ====
Georgia was ranked fifth in the preseason AP Poll going into the 2025 season. Smart led the Bulldogs to a 3–0 start, including an overtime 44–41 victory over Tennessee where they overcame a 21–7 deficit. In the following game against Alabama, the Bulldogs lost 24–21. Georgia won all of their remaining regular season games, including a 43–35 win over #5 Ole Miss and a 35–10 win over #10 Texas. Georgia qualified for the SEC Championship, where they avenged their regular season loss to Alabama 28–7. Georgia earned the 3-seed for the College Football Playoff and a first-round bye. In a rematch against Ole Miss in the Sugar Bowl, Smart and the Bulldogs season ended with a 39–34 loss in the quarterfinals.

== Personal life ==
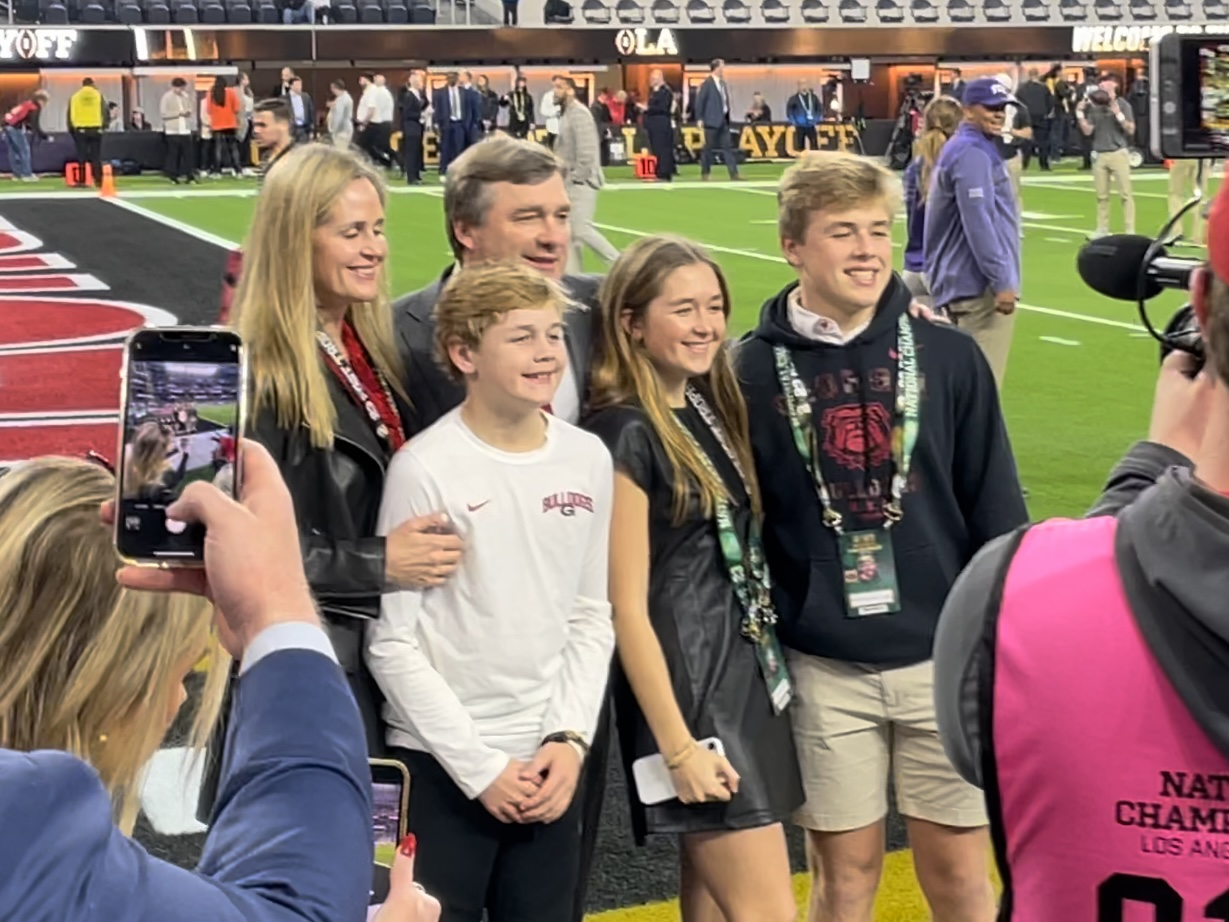
The Smart family poses for reporters ahead of the 2023 CFP title game.

Smart is married to Mary "Beth" Elizabeth Lycett, who played basketball for the University of Georgia. The couple have three children.

Smart's father, Sonny Smart, died on January 4, 2025.

== Head coaching record ==
Year	Team	Overall	Conference	Standing	Bowl/playoffs	Coaches^{#}	AP^{°}
Georgia Bulldogs (Southeastern Conference) (2016–present)
2016	Georgia	8–5	4–4	T–2nd (Eastern)	W Liberty		
2017	Georgia	13–2	7–1	1st (Eastern)	W Rose^{†}, L CFP NCG^{†}	2	2
2018	Georgia	11–3	7–1	1st (Eastern)	L Sugar^{†}	8	7
2019	Georgia	12–2	7–1	1st (Eastern)	W Sugar^{†}	4	4
2020	Georgia	8–2	7–2	2nd (Eastern)	W Peach^{†}	7	7
2021	Georgia	14–1	8–0	1st (Eastern)	W Orange^{†}, W CFP NCG^{†}	1	1
2022	Georgia	15–0	8–0	1st (Eastern)	W Peach^{†}, W CFP NCG^{†}	1	1
2023	Georgia	13–1	8–0	1st (Eastern)	W Orange^{†}	3	4
2024	Georgia	11–3	6–2	T–2nd	L Sugar^{†}	6	6
2025	Georgia	12–2	7–1	T–1st	L Sugar^{†}	5	6
2026	Georgia	10–1	8–1	1st			
Georgia:		127–22	77–13				
Total:		127–22					
National championship Conference title Conference division title or championship game berth
^{†}Indicates CFP / New Years' Six bowl.; ^{#}Rankings from final Coaches Poll.; ^{°}Rankings from final AP Poll.
