= Jan Kemp (academic) =

American academic(1949–2008)

Jan H. Kemp PhD
- Born: March 13, 1949; Griffin, Georgia
- Died: December 4, 2008 (aged 59); Athens, Georgia
- Occupation: English instructor
- Years active: 1976–1990

Academic background
- Education: University of Georgia (BA, PhD)

Jan H. Kemp (March 13, 1949 – December 4, 2008) was an American academic and English teacher who exposed the bias in passing college football players and filed a lawsuit against the University of Georgia.

== Early life and career ==
Born in Griffin, Georgia, Kemp earned a bachelor's degree in journalism and a doctorate in English education from the University of Georgia. She began teaching at her alma mater in the developmental program in September 1976. In 1981 Kemp was one of the teachers who complained claiming that Georgia officials had intervened allowing nine college football players to pass a remedial English course, allowing them to play against Notre Dame in the Sugar Bowl for the national championship in 1981.

== Lawsuit and reinstatement ==
Kemp was demoted in 1982 and dismissed one year later. She then filed a lawsuit claiming she had been fired due to her complaints about the passing of players. During the time after she was dismissed Kemp tried to commit suicide twice. The University defended its actions, saying that Kemp was dismissed for "disruptive conduct and for failure to conduct adequate scholarly research."

The jury found the University liable for the illegal dismissal of Kemp, and she was awarded $2.5 million, which was later reduced to $1.08 million. Kemp was reinstated in July 1986, and University President Fred C. Davison resigned. After the trial Kemp spoke to The New York Times, saying, "All over the country, athletes are used to produce revenue. I've seen what happens when the lights dim and the crowd fades. They're left with nothing. I want that stopped." Kemp retired from teaching in 1990.

== Personal life and death ==
Kemp was married to her husband, William Kemp, for 17 years, before divorcing him in February 1987. They had a son and daughter. She died in Athens, Georgia, on December 4, 2008, at the age of 59. Her son stated that she had died from complications of Alzheimer's disease.

== Legacy ==
Kemp was named a hero of the 1980s by People. Following her death, Pat Forde wrote for ESPN, "For everyone who cares about maintaining education's fundamental role within the pseudo-professional world of college athletics, Kemp is a hero. For every athlete who has been helped toward a degree by enhanced academic support, Kemp is a hero. And for everyone who ever stood on principle in the face of institutional backlash, Kemp is a hero."

A 2018 book, Take Down: Inside the Jan Kemp Affair, details the story of the University of Georgia lawsuit and scandal.
