= Damon Evans (athletic director) =

American football player (born 1970)

Current position
- Title: Athletic director
- Team: SMU
- Conference: Atlantic Coast Conference

Biographical details
- Born: 1970 (age 55–56); Nebraska, U.S.

Playing career
- 1988–1991: Georgia
- Position: Wide receiver

Administrative career (AD unless noted)
- 1994–1995: Missouri (director of Compliance)
- 1995–1998: SEC (asst. Commissioner)
- 1998–2004: Georgia (senior assoc. AD)
- 2004–2010: Georgia
- 2014–2018: Maryland (senior assoc. AD)
- 2017–2018: Maryland (interim AD)
- 2018–2025: Maryland
- 2025–present: SMU

Damon M. Evans is the athletics director at the Southern Methodist University. Previously, Evans had served as the interim and then permanent athletic director at the University of Maryland from 2017 until 2025.

After graduating from Gainesville High School in Hall County, Georgia, Evans played football for the University of Georgia (UGA), and graduated from the Terry College of Business in 1992 with a Bachelor of Business Administration (BBA) degree in finance. He earned his Master of Education (M.Ed.) in sports management from UGA in 1994.

Evans was an intern with the Southeastern Conference (SEC) in 1993 as a compliance and academic affairs assistant, then served as director of compliance and operations at the University of Missouri in 1994. In 1995, Evans returned to the SEC as the director of compliance and was promoted to assistant commissioner for compliance in 1997. He returned to UGA as an associate athletics director in 1998.

Evans served from 1998 to 2001 as a member of the NCAA Division I-A management council and as chair of the UGA academic task force in charge of reviewing academic credentials of prospective student-athletes. He became senior associate athletics director in 2000. In December 2003, UGA president Michael F. Adams announced that Evans would succeed long-time AD and former Bulldogs coach Vince Dooley on July 1, 2004.

As of 2006, the University of Georgia Athletic Association comprised 19 intercollegiate teams, over 500 student-athletes, a $65 million budget and a 250-person staff. For fiscal 2005, the Athletic Association had the largest operating profit among collegiate athletic programs at US$23.9 Million from a gross profit of US$68.8 Million. SportsBusiness Journal, citing Equity in Athletics Disclosure Act forms, said UGA reported $67.05 million in football revenue in 2007–2008, second only to the University of Texas ($72.95 million).

In October 2017, Evans was named interim athletic director at the University of Maryland after former athletic director, Kevin Anderson, announced he would take a six-month sabbatical leave. On June 25, 2018, Evans was named permanent athletic director by the university.

Evans was arrested for DUI on June 30, 2010. The passenger in the car, then 28-year-old Courtney Fuhrmann of Atlanta, was arrested for disorderly conduct. Evans was asked for his resignation and agreed to resign from UGA.
