= Omer Clyde Aderhold =

American academic (1899–1969)

President of the University of Georgia
- In office 1950–1967
- Preceded by: Jonathan Clark Rogers
- Succeeded by: Frederick Corbet Davison

Personal details
- Born: November 7, 1899 Lavonia, Georgia
- Died: July 4, 1969 (aged 69) Athens, Georgia
- Education: University of Georgia, Ohio State University

Omer Clyde "O.C." Aderhold (November 7, 1899 – July 4, 1969) was President of the University of Georgia (UGA) in Athens from 1950 until 1967.

The son of a Lavonia, Georgia, farmer, he graduated from the University of Georgia with an agriculture degree in 1923. Following graduation, he became a high school principal at the age of twenty-four in Jefferson County, Georgia. Three years later, he was chosen as the county’s superintendent of public schools, a position he held until 1929, when he resigned to become associate professor of rural education at the University of Georgia. Here he devoted “a major portion of his time to the training of agricultural and rural teachers,” according to one newspaper report.

In 1936-37, Aderhold took a leave of absence to work on his PhD degree in education at the Ohio State University, which he received in 1938. In 1946, he was named dean of the College of Education. He was named president of the university in 1950, a position he held for seventeen years until his retirement in 1967.

At the time of his death in 1969, the Athens-Banner Herald noted that Dr. Aderhold had been associated with the university for 50 years as a “student, teacher, administrator and elder statesman.” During seventeen years as president, the university’s enrollment tripled, the research budget grew from $2 million a year to more than $13 million, and the value of the physical plant increased from $12 million to $100 million. “But Dr. Aderhold was much more than a super-successful administrator. He was an engaging and sympathetic man who took a personal interest in his students, his employees, and his many other friends,” the Herald-Banner editorialized.

He successfully led the university through court-ordered integration in January 1961 after admission of its first black students, Charlayne Hunter and Hamilton Holmes, came with first days rallies and protests. Hunter, who became Charlayne Hunter-Gault after her marriage, graduated from the Henry W. Grady College of Journalism and Mass Communication at Georgia in 1963 and went on to become a successful journalist for PBS NewsHour (MacNeil/Lehrer NewsHour), as well as The New York Times, National Public Radio, and CNN. After graduating from Georgia, Holmes became a medical doctor and was the first black student admitted to the Emory University School of Medicine.

Aderhold played a controversial role in the scandal involving athletic director and ex-football coach Wally Butts, who was accused giving away the football team's play strategy to Alabama Coach Paul "Bear" Bryant in a telephone conversation on August 15, 1962. Butts and Bryant filed libel suits against the Saturday Evening Post for its "Story of a College Football Fix" article in its March 23, 1963, issue. Aderhold testified against Butts in the trial, which was held in Atlanta from Aug. 5-18, 1963, testifying that Butts' character was "bad" and that he would not believe him under oath.

Aderhold retired in 1967 and died in Athens on July 4, 1969. He is buried in Oconee Hill Cemetery in that city.

Preceded by Jonathan Clark Rogers	President of the University of Georgia; 1950 – 1967	Succeeded by Frederick Corbet Davison
