= Georgia Political Review =

American student-run political magazine based in Georgia

- Categories: Politics, Culture
- Frequency: Biannually - every semester weekly newsletter
- Founded: May 2011; 14 years ago
- Based in: Athens, Georgia, US
- Language: English
- Website: georgiapoliticalreview.com

Georgia Political Review (GPR) is an American political student-run magazine, newsletter, and website that publishes at the University of Georgia.

== Background ==
Founded in May 2011 by six undergraduate students at the university, GPR discusses local, state, national, and international political issues. It also publishes articles on its website, including interviews with professors and politicians, as well as coverage of local political events. In addition, GPR publishes a weekly newsletter called GPR Digest, which offers short summaries of recent political and cultural events, and has X, Facebook, and Instagram accounts. Every year, GPR hosts The Great Debate, a moderated debate among different college political groups.
