= Basking Ridge (disambiguation) =

Basking Ridge is an unincorporated community in New Jersey. It may also refer to:

- Basking Ridge Classical School (also known as Brick Academy)
- Basking Ridge station
- Presbyterian Church in Basking Ridge
