= Lumpe =

Lumpe is a surname of German origin. Notable people with the surname include:

- Eduard Lumpe (1813–1876), Austrian obstetrician
- Jerry Lumpe (1933-2014), American professional baseball player and coach
- Sheila Lumpe (1935-2014), American politician
