= Robert Finley =

American educator and clergyman

The Reverend Robert Finley
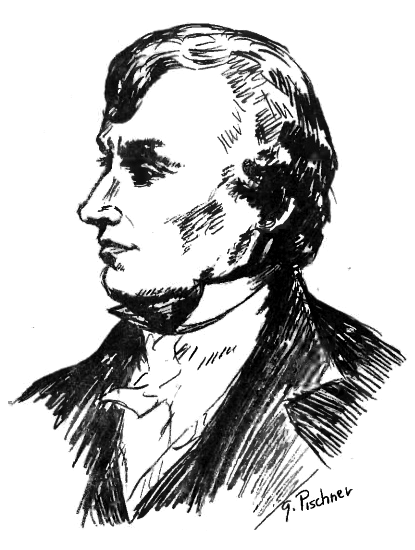

President of the University of Georgia
- In office 1817–1817
- Preceded by: John Brown
- Succeeded by: Moses Waddel

Personal details
- Born: 1772 Princeton, New Jersey, British America
- Died: November 3, 1817 (aged 44–45) Athens, Georgia, U.S.
- Spouse: Esther Caldwell
- Children: Robert Finley, Rev., Esther Caldwell
- Relatives: Josiah Finly (brother); James Caldwell (father-in-law)
- Education: College of New Jersey

Robert Finley (1772 – November 3, 1817) was an American Presbyterian clergyman and educator who is known as one of the founders of the American Colonization Society, which established the settlement of Liberia in West Africa as a place for free African Americans.

He was a pastor for 20 years at a Presbyterian church in Basking Ridge, New Jersey, and also taught in elementary school and at a boys' academy. He served briefly as president of the University of Georgia in 1817 before his death.

Born in Princeton, New Jersey, Finley graduated at the age of 15 from the College of New Jersey (later renamed Princeton University).

== Early life ==
Finley was born in Princeton, New Jersey in 1772 to James Finley and his wife Ann Angrest. His father, James Finley, was born in 1737 in Glasgow, Scotland, where he was trained as a yarn merchant and where he became acquainted with Rev John Witherspoon, then a pastor in the town of Paisley about six miles from Glasgow. His father immigrated from Scotland to New Jersey in 1769. His paternal grandparents were James Finley from Paisley and Ann McDonald Finley.

== Career ==
Robert Finley entered the College of New Jersey at the age of 11 and graduated in 1787, at the age of 15, when it served more as a boys' academy. He taught at several places, including Charleston, South Carolina, where many households held enslaved African Americans. Thousands of others worked on plantations outside the city.

The Presbytery of New Brunswick, New Jersey licensed Finley as a minister in 1794. He returned to Princeton in 1793 to study theology and served as a tutor. He was appointed as a trustee of the university in 1806 and served until his resignation in 1817, when he departed for Georgia.

In 1795, Finley was ordained as the pastor of the Presbyterian church at Basking Ridge, where he served for 19 years. He was a popular preacher and noted educator, developing the concept of the modern Sunday School curriculum.

== Basking Ridge, New Jersey ==
Finley taught at the Princeton University Grammar School; and at the Basking Ridge, New Jersey Classical School (Brick Academy), a boys' seminary. He worked there from 1795 until he accepted the presidency of the University of Georgia (UGA) in July 1817.

In 1795, Dr. Robert Finley re-established the private academy, known as the Basking Ridge Classical School, conducting classes first at the Presbyterian parsonage and then in a new frame school building erected near the church. In 1809, with enrollment expanding, Finley organized financing and construction of a new two-story brick building, prominently located in the center of the village of Basking Ridge (Brick Academy).

Boys were drawn from both the local area and more distant places, such as Virginia and New York City, to attend this private preparatory academy. Most were given a classical education in preparation for entering the College of New Jersey (later expanded and renamed Princeton University). Students boarded with Dr. Finley and other residents. Two buildings still standing near the Brick Academy were later used as dormitories.

== American Colonization Society ==
Dr. Finley and Samuel John Mills helped organize the National Colonization Society of America and the American Colonization Society in Washington, D.C. in 1816 and 1817. They solicited contributions from many contemporaries, including former students such as Charles Muir Campbell.

The American Colonization Society (ACS) proposed to relocate free American blacks to a colony in West Africa. The Society gained support from both some abolitionists and slaveholders, for differing reasons. Free blacks faced discrimination in both the free states of the North, where slavery was abolished after the Revolution (in a gradual process in some places), and in the slave societies of the South. In the latter areas, free blacks were feared as being influential in disrupting slaves and leading slave rebellions.

Some abolitionists believed that black people would face better chances for freedom and prosperity in Africa than in the United States. Also, if there were a colony available to them where they could be resettled, abolitionists hoped to gain more manumissions of slaves and eventually end the institution. Between January 7, 1822, and the American Civil War, more than 15,000 freed and free-born American black people, and 3,198 Afro-Caribbeans, relocated to the settlement. Pioneers suffered extremely high mortality rates in the early years from new tropical diseases and a lack of sanitation and infrastructure. Finley's brother, Josiah Finley, was governor of Mississippi-in-Africa (an ACS colony on the Pepper Coast) from June 1837 to 10 September 1838, when local fishermen murdered him.

African Americans gradually moved into positions in the colony's government. The Republic of Liberia declared its independence on July 26, 1847. The U.S. did not recognize Liberia's independence until February 5, 1862, during the American Civil War, due to prior opposition from Southern Congressmen. After the South seceded, remaining legislators voted to recognize the republic.

Finley did not live to see any of these developments. Soon after the ACS was founded, Finley was selected as the next president of the University of Georgia. In 1817, he fell ill during the journey south to Athens, Georgia. He died three months after arriving. Finley is buried in Jackson Street Cemetery on the north campus of the university.

== Archival collections ==
The Presbyterian Historical Society in Philadelphia, Pennsylvania, has sermons and a Latin manuscript from Robert Finley in its collections.

Preceded by John Brown	President of the University of Georgia; 1817	Succeeded by Moses Waddel
