= Basking Ridge white oak =

White oak in Basking Ridge, New Jersey

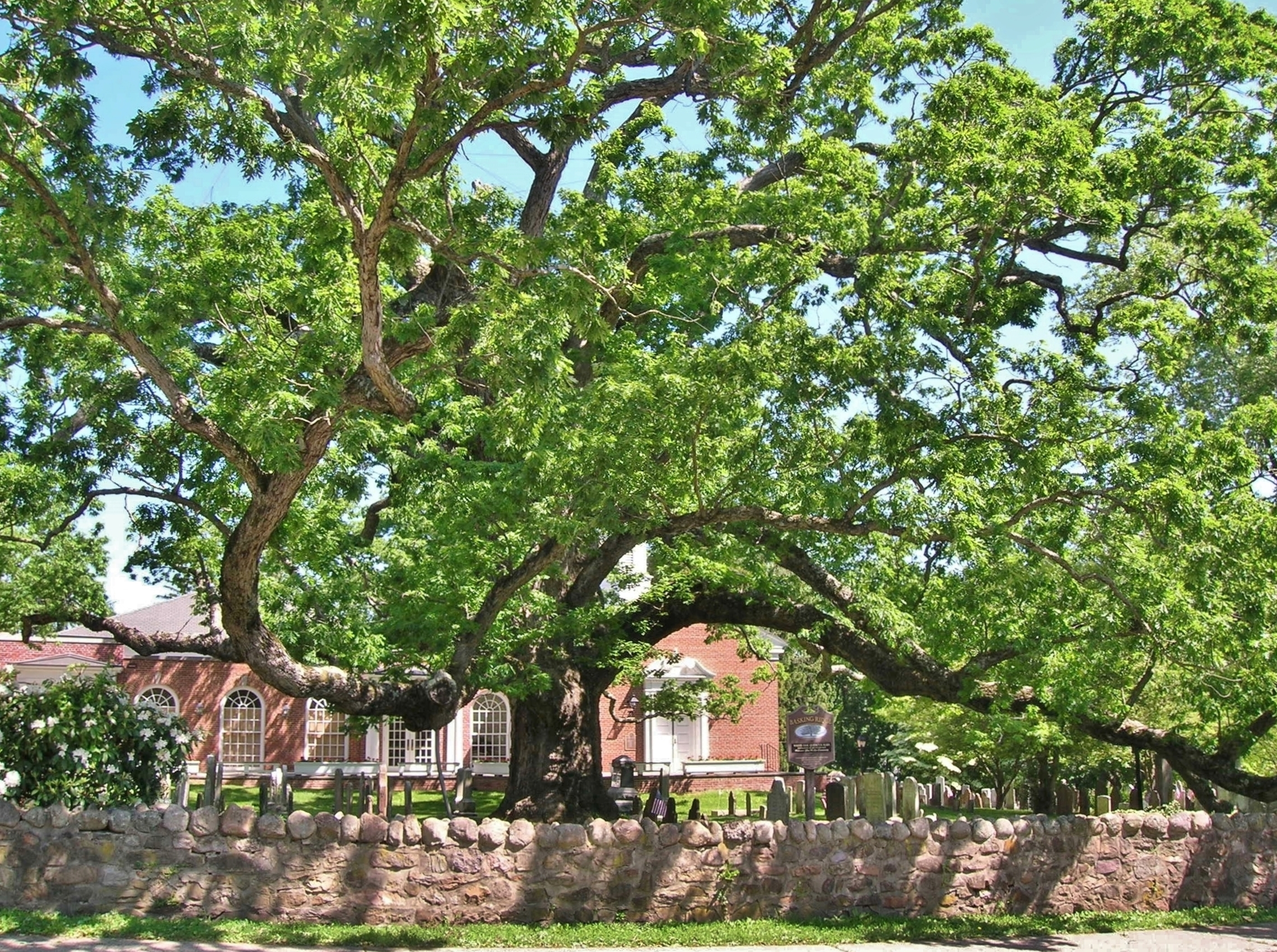
- Basking Ridge white oak in May 2013
- Interactive map of Basking Ridge white oak
- Species: White oak (Quercus alba)
- Coordinates: 40°42′24.5″N 74°32′56.5″W
- Date felled: April 26, 2017

The Basking Ridge white oak (also known as the Holy Oak) was a white oak tree that stood in the churchyard of the Presbyterian Church in Basking Ridge, New Jersey. The tree was over 600 years old and died in 2016, before being cut down in 2017. It stood at 97 feet (30 meters) tall, and may have been the oldest white oak in the world.

== History ==
The Basking Ridge white oak was located in the historical graveyard of the Presbyterian Church in Basking Ridge. English evangelist George Whitfield and American clergyman James Davenport preached under it on November 5, 1740 to a crowd of 3,000 during the First Great Awakening. George Washington's troops were drilled on the village green, within view, and Washington picnicked under the tree with Lafayette. The 5,500 French troops under General Jean-Baptiste Donatien de Vimeur marched by in 1781 on their route to Yorktown, Virginia and the decisive battle of the American Revolutionary War.

== Description ==
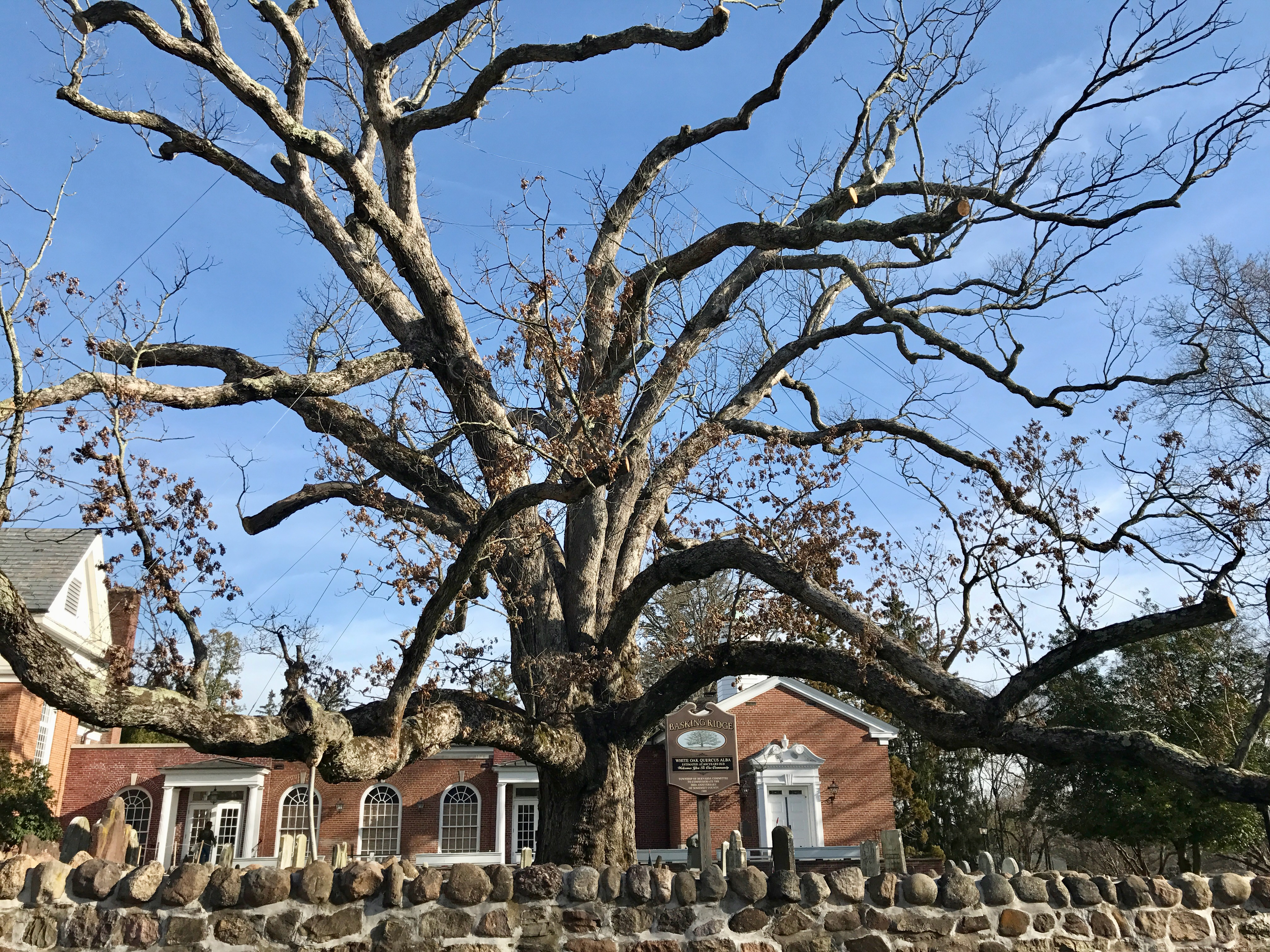
Tree in April 2017, days before it was cut down

The Holy Oak was 619 years old when it died in 2016. It stood at a height of 97 feet (30 m) and had a trunk circumference of 20 feet (6 m). Its spread was over 130 feet (40 m). In its final years, its lower branches were supported by metal bars.

== Death and cutting down ==
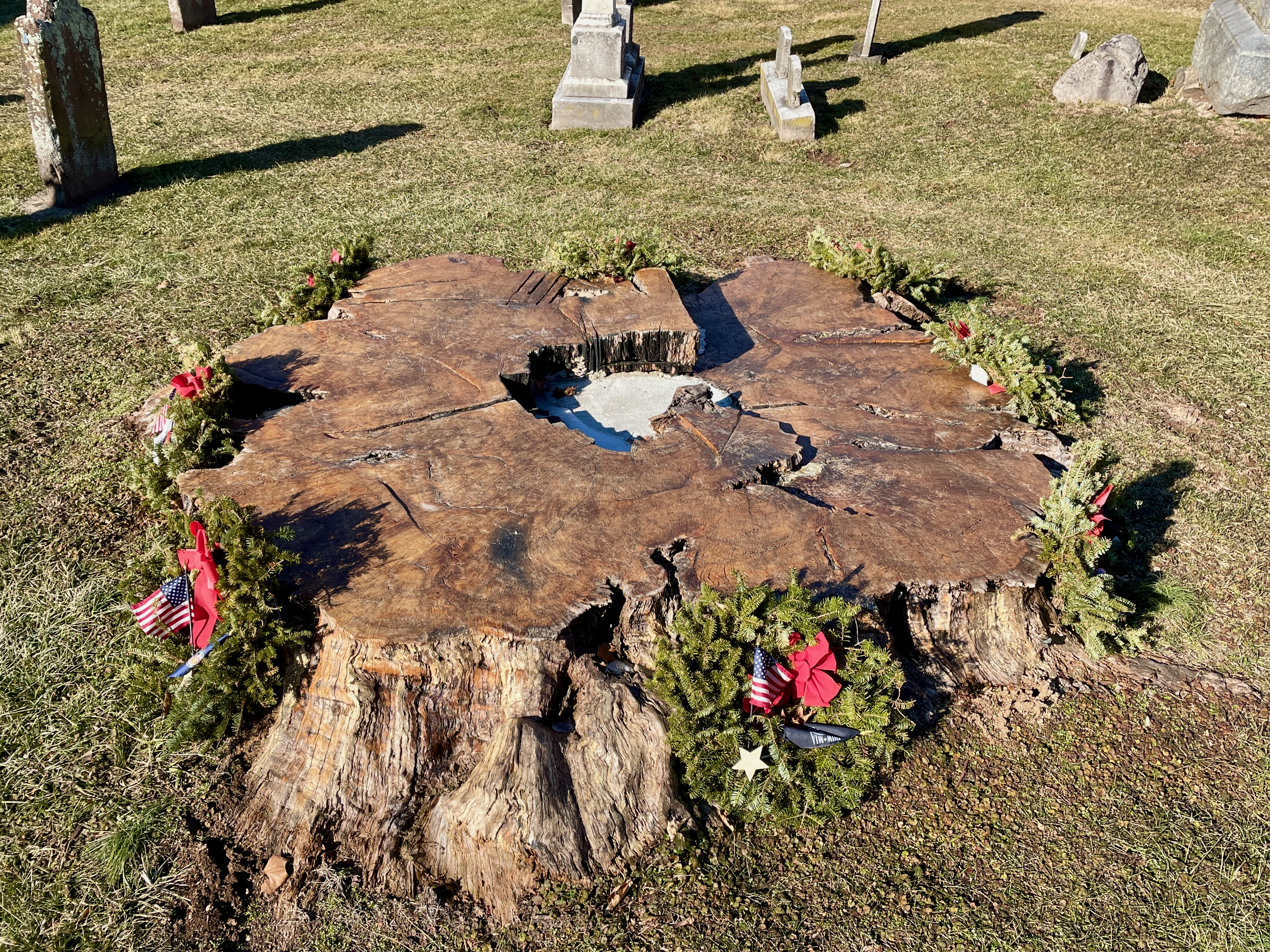
Stump after being cut down

In June 2016, the tree was "failing to thrive" and showed signs of distress as its upper parts failed to sprout leaves. By September 2016, the tree had died. It was cut down over a three-day period, with the work finished on April 26, 2017. A young white oak grown from an acorn of the old tree was planted in the churchyard.

The current biggest tree in New Jersey is identified as another white oak in the yard of the Sparta Historical Association of Sparta.

== See also ==
- List of individual trees
