= Charles Muir Campbell =

Scottish-American businessman

Charles Muir Campbell (September 1, 1795 – October 12, 1874) was a Scottish businessman in early Princeton, New Jersey, an early pioneer farmer in Illinois, and he spent the remainder of his life in Springfield, Illinois, where he was a justice of the peace. While in New Jersey, he was one of the initial subscribers to the American Colonization Society.

== Scottish roots ==
Little is known about his parents or birthplace in Scotland. His family Bible is dated 1818, so it appears to have been started when he was in his early 20s, probably around the time of his marriage. Inscriptions in the Bible indicate that he was born 1 September 1795 in Scotland. Genealogical research leads to a possible connection to the Campbells of Kirnan. Margaret (?) Campbell was the mother of Thomas Campbell (the well known Scottish poet), and her brother was Daniel Campbell. They had brothers and nephews in the West Indies and Virginia, as well as connections to the Muir family and Dr John Witherspoon. The Presbyterian roots of Dr Robert Finley are entwined with Dr. John Witherspoon, and the confluence of these families in Basking Ridge (at the time Baskingridge) and New Jersey is certainly more than coincidence. There is record of a marriage between a Charles Campbell and an Isobel Muir in the 17th century in Ayr Scotland. There are a handful of other Campbell's with Muir for a middle name – most notably William Muir Campbell, with several patents to his credit in Glasgow Scotland around 1840. There are also some MUIR names found in Jamaica. This reference to the Muir and Campbell descendants includes a reference to a James Campbell – although he predates the "uncle James Campbell" of CMC by 150+ years.

The father of the poet, Thomas Campbell, had two brothers was mostly from the Glasgow area. There are marriages between Campbell and Muir families in Muirkirk parish, the county of Ayr, Scotland. The identity of CMC's parents would greatly clarify the source of his initial wealth and family ties. Thomas Campbell, the poet, would have been in line to inherit the entail estates of Ascog, etc. - had his uncle Frederick not returned from Virginia and become a naturalized British Subject by private Act of Parliament. {add ref to published Act on Google Books - } The estate of Ascog in Bute, Scotland, eventually did transfer to the Frederick Stewart Campbell heirs, but was subjected to lengthy lawsuits. More research is needed regarding Dr. Washington Tennant, or Anna Stewart – later Anna Tennant.

In October of 2024, The Campbell DNA Project determined that Big Y DNA testing performed by Family Tree DNA determined that speculation about Charles descendancy from the Campbells of Kirnan was likely to be true.

== West Indies ==
Again, inscriptions in the family Bible indicate that Charles Muir Campbell was "taken as an infant by his parents to the West Indies". In subsequent census data, he reported his birthplace as Jamaica or West Indies or W.I. There were many Scottish folks present in the West Indies. Some made their fortunes there, others met their death there due to disease or slave revolts. The Scottish system of inheritance typically meant that the oldest son would inherit the family land and titles in Scotland, while the second and subsequent sons would have to find their own way in the world. This often meant travelling to places like the West Indies to try their hand at sugar or coffee production. The idea was that they would make their fortune or die of disease. Some intended to "make their fortune" and return to Scotland. These are well documented in the book Sojourners in the Sun, by Alex Karass.

While the bulk of the Scottish people were in Jamaica, West Indies, there were also many people present on other Caribbean islands. The "Ceded Territories" and Demerera (British Guiana) may also hold clues as to the fate of Charles Muir Campbell's parents. The years from his birth in 1795 until 1798 (the year he claimed on his application to become a United States citizen), were particularly dangerous in the West Indies. These years included the raids during the "Second Maroon War", and the bloody execution of 50 prisoners following the "Fedon Revolution". See transcript of report of Fedon Revolution If his parents weren't killed in one of these uprisings, they could have just as easily died of disease in their new environments.

Family history says that Charles Muir Campbell's life was in danger as an orphan and heir, so he was smuggled out in a boatload of orphans. The family Bible simply says that he was taken to the United States by his uncle, James Campbell, and put to school in Basking Ridge, NJ.

Following the Fedon Revolution, which included the execution of Governor Homes, a James Campbell became the acting Governor. If this was the same "uncle James Campbell", then he could have arranged transport for his nephew. There are passenger ship records for James Campbell landing in the United States during the appropriate time period. But hard evidence has yet to surface. Years later, Charles Muir Campbell applied for U. S. citizenship and claimed to have entered the country permanently since June 1798. (find exact date)

== New Jersey: 1798 to 1840 or 1841 ==
Connected with many notable names in early New Jersey history, he was friend and contemporary with prominent New Jersey citizens including the REV Robert Finley, Samuel Southard (governor of NJ), Emley Olden, and many others. He was one of the original subscribers to the American Colonization Society. Schooled at Rev Robert Finley Classical Academy in Basking Ridge, NJ with these contemporaries, he elected not to attend the College of New Jersey (now Princeton). He married Agness Schenck from an old Dutch family and began his own family in Penns Neck, NJ. Later they moved to Princeton, NJ and established a large coach and harness making business on at 32 and 34 Mercer Street in Princeton NJ. Pictures of houses including 32 and 34 Mercer Street This "factory" employed upwards of 40 young men and the coaches were sold far and wide, including the stagecoaches used in Mexico on the Vera Cruz stagecoach line. [Samuel Southard] had a weakness for fine horses and carriages and had ordered a Campbell Coach.

A business downturn around 1840 in New Jersey found Campbell overextended. He had been acquiring property along the New Jersey Turnpike and was forced to sell most of his holdings. He sold off his coach and harness making shop and home and moved his family to the wilds of Illinois.

== Illinois: 1840 to his death in 1874 (A new beginning) ==
The trip to Illinois probably followed the newly completed National Road, which left from Cumberland, Maryland and travelled to Illinois. The road ended in Illinois, uncertain as to which way to turn. The Campbell family and friends, (a party of about 15 travellers), settled in Jerseyville, Illinois. This area was aptly named due to the large number of emigrants from the state of New Jersey, and it sits in Jersey County.

The family began a new life as farmers in Jerseyville. They apparently continued with their coach and harness making trades (as indicated by census data for occupation). Land records indicate that they began buying and selling land grants that were issued to soldiers. By trading and accumulating property, they managed to piece together three large and adjacent farms just south of Pawnee, IL.

Around 1851 or 1852 they moved much of the family to the Pawnee, IL farms. Much of this was virgin prairie grassland. The creek that runs South of Pawnee is now called "Horse Creek". Family history said that they found a dead horse in that creek when they arrived and it was initially called "Dead Horse Creek". This creek crosses two of the three family farms. Each farm was about 1/2 mile wide (East-West) and 1 mile long (North-South). Three brothers each received a farm and a sum of cash from Charles Muir Campbell.

Charles Muir Campbell's wife, Agness Schenck, died in August 1852, shortly after moving to Pawnee. Charles Muir Campbell lived with his son James on the "middle farm". James was known as "Big Jim" Campbell and had a son, called "Little Jim" Campbell. They were friends and hosts to [Abraham Lincoln] and his son, Robert Todd Lincoln. (Insert newspaper clipping - "He Knew Abe Lincoln".) Charles Muir Campbell had always had a big family and many children, so after the death of his first wife, he eventually married a young widow named Rebecca (Ely?).

Having been well educated in one of the best college prep schools in New Jersey, Charles Muir Campbell was a bit of a scholar as well as businessman turned farmer. He moved to the newly booming capital of Springfield, Illinois, with his second wife, Rebecca, and her children from her previous marriage. At the age of 70 (?), they lived for a year in the American (?) Hotel in downtown Springfield with her school-age children. Charles Muir Campbell was a justice of the peace in Springfield, Illinois, until his death in 1874. His offices were on a corner about a block from the old train station and Capitol building.

Charles Muir Campbell died October 12, 1874, from kidney stones and is buried at Block 7, Lot 261, of the famous Oak Ridge Cemetery, not far from his friend, Abraham Lincoln. Test link to music

== Ongoing research ==
- The Skye Boat Song
- Campbell surname changes to/from: Stewart Stuart Gordon Fraser McLeod
- Act of Naturalization for Frederick Stewart Campbell mentioned in this court case. Images of original records

are available online.

- Flora Mure Campbell - variations of MUIR include MURE MOORE MOOR MOR MOIRA etc...
- Variations of Ayr include Ayrshire Ayers Ayars etc...
- Rev. Archibald Campbell, minister in Westmoreland County, Virginia
- Alexander Campbell, merchant in Falmouth, Virginia. Partnered with Daniel Campbell and returned to Scotland 20 years or so prior to the Revolutionary War. He was father to the poet, Thomas Campbell.
- John Campbell, Esq., a lawyer and probably a relative handling legal matters in Virginia regarding inheritance of Ascog estate in Scotland.
- David Wardlaw, Esq. (W.S.?), their lawyer in Scotland who handled the inheritance and advised them on the course of action to take to surmount the restrictive covenants. (See letters at Virginia Historical Society Library archives.)
- Thomas Campbell, the Poet.
- Charles Harrod Campbell, military officer in NY, descended from Campbell of Bredalbane Links: Biography
- Archibald Campbell Fraser of Lovat
