= Eduard Lumpe =

Austrian obstetrician

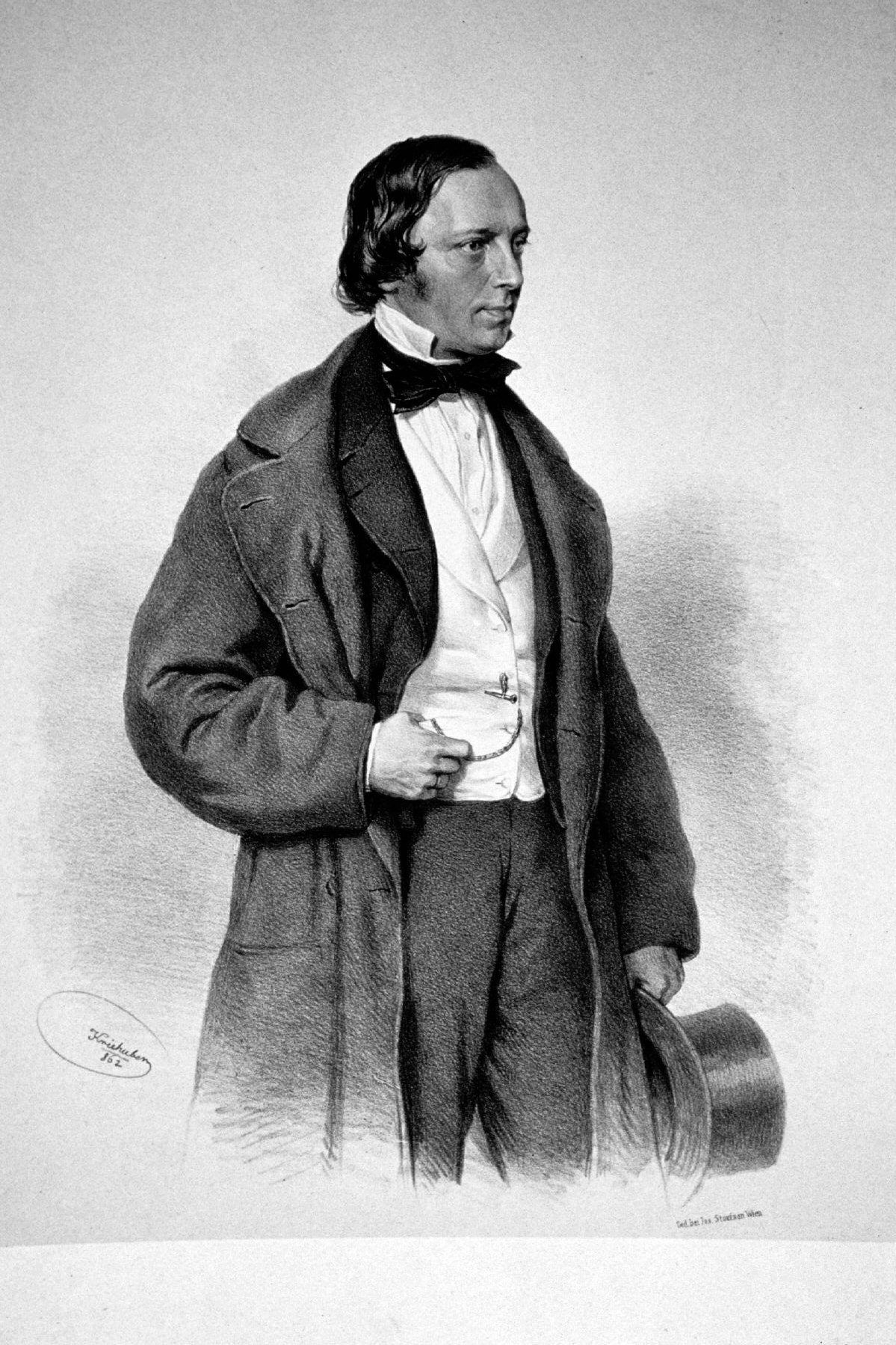
Eduard Lumpe Lithography by Josef Kriehuber, 1862

Eduard Lumpe (1813–1876) was an obstetrician working in Vienna General Hospital as assistant to professor Johann Klein. He is mainly known for compiling a list of causes for childbed fever in 1845, reflecting the (in retrospect: limited) insights at the time. The disease was predominantly epidemic, i.e. due to miasmatic influences. Other causal factors included: general deprivation, worry, shame, attempted abortion, fear of death, dietary disorders, exposure to cold, local miasmas and difficult delivery. Ignaz Semmelweis ridiculed Lumpe's work.

Lumpe's work reflected mainstream views, see for instance the work of Charles Delucena Meigs for a similar American account in 1854.
