= Josiah Meigs =

American academic

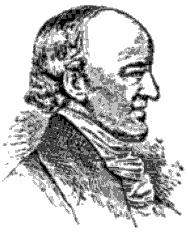

President of the University of Georgia
- In office 1801–1810
- Preceded by: Abraham Baldwin
- Succeeded by: John Brown

Personal details
- Born: August 21, 1757 Middletown, Connecticut, British America
- Died: September 4, 1822 (aged 65) Washington, D.C., U.S.
- Children: Clara Meigs
- Education: Yale University
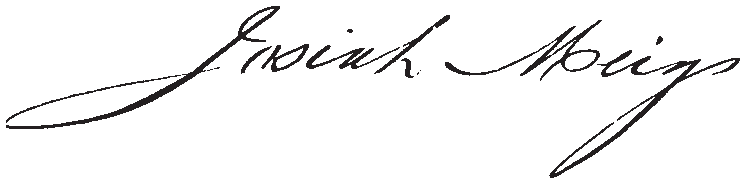
- Signature

Josiah Meigs (August 21, 1757 – September 4, 1822) was an American academic, journalist, and government official. He was the first acting president of the University of Georgia in Athens, where he implemented the university's first physics curriculum in 1801, and also president of the Columbian Institute for the Promotion of Arts and Sciences.

== Early life and education ==
Meigs was the 13th and last child of Jonathan Meigs and Elizabeth Hamlin Meigs. His older brother was Return J. Meigs, Sr., whose son (Josiah's nephew) was Return J. Meigs, Jr., who served as a United States Senator and Governor of Ohio.

After graduating from Yale University in 1778 with a Bachelor of Arts (B.A) degree, Meigs studied law and was a Yale tutor in mathematics, natural philosophy, and astronomy from 1781 to 1784. He was admitted to the bar in New Haven, Connecticut, in 1783, and served as New Haven city clerk from 1784 to 1789. During this period, he and Eleutheros Dana established and published The New Haven Gazette, later known as The New Haven Gazette and The Connecticut, a magazine. In 1788, Meigs published the first American Medical Journal.

=== Career ===
In 1789, Meigs left New Haven, Connecticut, for St. George, Bermuda, where he practiced law and was involved in defending the owners of U.S. vessels that had been captured by British privateers. In 1794 he returned to the United States and took the chair of mathematics and natural philosophy at Yale. As a Republican, he was in conflict with the Federalists who ran Yale. He taught there until 1801 when he was chosen as the first acting president of the University of Georgia in Athens. His salary at Georgia was fixed at $1500 annually, and he was given $400 in moving expenses for his family.

At Georgia, Meigs implemented the university's first physics curriculum in 1801. He resigned as president on August 9, 1810, after clashing with the university's board of trustees; however, he continued on in the position of Professor of Mathematics, Natural Philosophy and Chemistry for one more year.

After his academic career at the University of Georgia, Meigs was appointed Surveyor General by President James Madison in 1812, and relocated to Cincinnati. Meigs, however, was astronomer more than surveyor and took instruction from his predecessor, Jared Mansfield, by correspondence and from his clerks in the Washington, D.C. office. He then accepted an appointment as Commissioner of the United States General Land Office in Washington, D.C., in 1814. During his tenure at the United States General Land Office, serving under James Monroe, he instituted the nation's first system of daily meteorological observations at the land offices throughout the country, which evolved into the National Weather Service.

=== Societies ===
In 1818, Meigs was elected a member of the American Philosophical Society in Philadelphia. During the 1820s, Meigs was a member, and at one point, president, of the Columbian Institute for the Promotion of Arts and Sciences. He was also one of the original corporators and trustees of Columbian College (now George Washington University), and professor of experimental philosophy there.

=== Personal ===
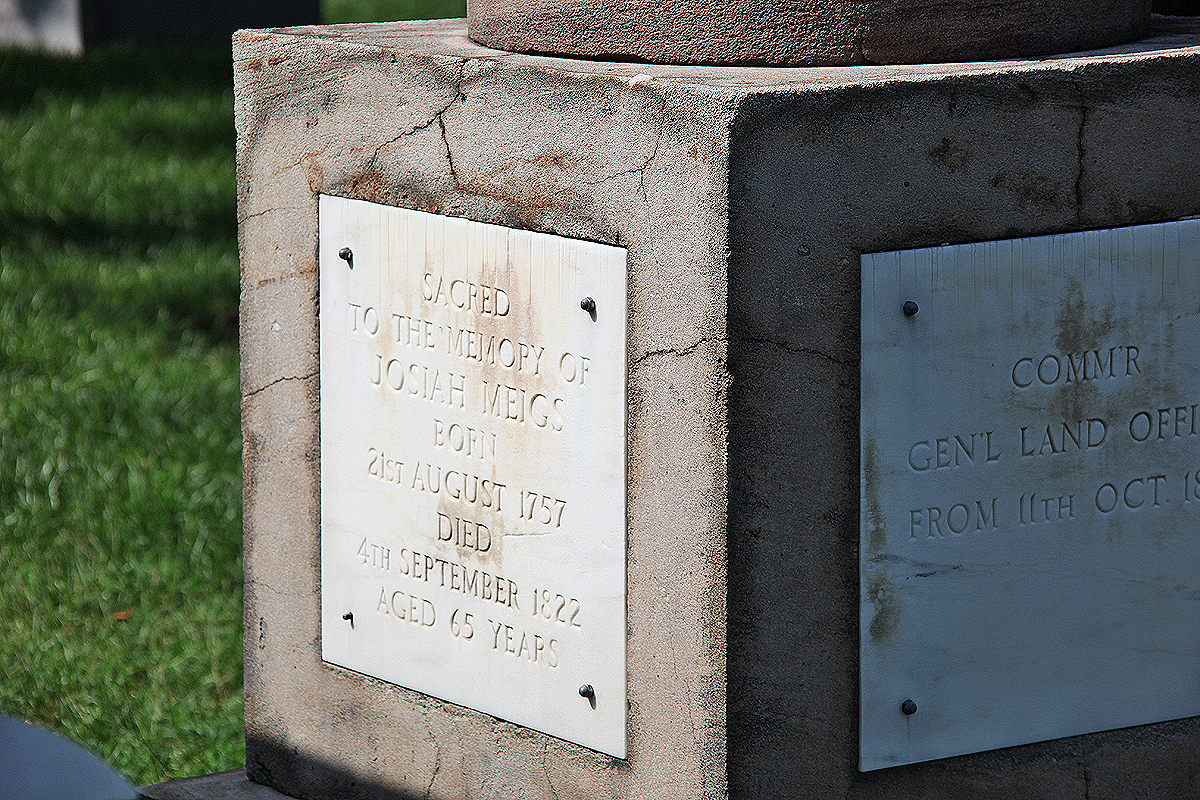
Marker over the grave of Josiah Meigs at Arlington National Cemetery

In 1782, Meigs married Clara Benjamin. Their son Henry Meigs served in the U.S. Congress. Another son, Charles Delucena Meigs, became a prominent obstetrician. Their daughter Clara married John Forsyth, U.S. Secretary of State under Andrew Jackson and Martin Van Buren. Among his grandchildren was the American Civil War Major General Montgomery C. Meigs.

Meigs died on September 4, 1822, and was buried in Holmead's Cemetery in Washington, D.C. In 1878, when the cemetery was disbanded and the graves removed, he was reinterred in Arlington National Cemetery in the lot of Major General Meigs.

=== Legacy ===
He is remembered at the University of Georgia in the name of the university's highest teaching honor. The university annually recognizes up to five faculty members with the Josiah Meigs Distinguished Teaching Professorship. The city of Meigs, Georgia, is named in his honor as is Meigs Street in Athens, Georgia.

== Sources ==
- History of the University of Georgia, Thomas Walter Reed, Imprint: Athens, Georgia : University of Georgia, ca. 1949
- Arlington National Cemetery headstone and short bio for Josiah Meigs
- New Georgia Encyclopedia entry for Josiah Meigs
- History of Meigs Hall on the UGA campus
- Meigs, William Montgomery (1887). Life of Josiah Meigs. Philadelphia.

Preceded by Abraham Baldwin	President of the University of Georgia; 1801–1810	Succeeded by John Brown
Government offices
Preceded by Jared Mansfield	Surveyor General of the Northwest Territory; 1813–1815	Succeeded by Edward Tiffin
Preceded by Edward Tiffin	Commissioner of the General Land Office; 1814–1822	Succeeded by John McLean
