= John Brown (educator) =

American academic administrator

Reverend John Brown

President of the University of Georgia
- In office 1811–1816
- Preceded by: Josiah Meigs
- Succeeded by: Robert Finley

Personal details
- Born: June 15, 1763 County Antrim, Ireland
- Died: December 11, 1842 (aged 79) Fort Gaines, Georgia
- Spouse: Mary McCullough
- Profession: Presbyterian minister

Rev. John Brown (June 15, 1763 – December 11, 1842) was the third president of the University of Georgia. He served in that capacity from 1811 until his resignation in 1816.

He was born on June 15, 1763, in County Antrim, Ireland, the son of Walter and Margaret Brown, who were Scottish-Irish Presbyterians. At the age of three, he emigrated with his parents to America aboard the ship The Earl of Donegal, arriving in Charleston, South Carolina, harbor on December 22, 1767. Brown's father obtained 200 acres per the Bounty Act of the South Carolina General Assembly, passed the 25th day of July 1761 to Protestants willing to settle in the South Carolina back-country that became Chester County. The Browns joined the Fishing Creek Presbyterian church.

When the American Revolution came to their area in 1780, John Brown, then 17, joined the South Carolina Militia under the command of Capt. John McClure and General Thomas Sumter. He was in the first attack on the British at Rocky Mount and at the Battle of Hanging Rock. Being a known patriot family, the British burned the family home, driving his parents to Mecklenburg County, North Carolina. Brown's sister, Jane Brown Gaston, was known for her bravery during the war as well.

After the war, Brown resumed his education. He studied under Samuel Eusebius McCorkle in Salisbury, North Carolina, and received a Doctor of Divinity degree. In 1788, the Presbytery of Concord (NC) licensed Brown as a Presbyterian minister. The now Reverend John Brown's first pastoral post was Old Waxsaw Presbyterian church, in Lancaster, South Carolina. Also in 1788, he married the Mary McCullough of Salisbury.

In 1792, Brown reorganized the congregations of Upper, Middle, and Lower Fishing Creek Presbyterian churches into one, and renamed them Richardson Presbyterian. From here in 1793, Brown was called to be the pastor of Beaver Creek, Hanging Rock and Miller's congregations in Kershaw County, South Carolina.

One of Brown's main concerns was education. For the next ten years, he was a professor at South Carolina College (later the university). During this time, he helped start schools: Lancaster Academy (SC) in 1802, and Wadesboro Academy (NC) in 1803, and served as a trustee and president. In 1811, Brown became president of the University of Georgia in Athens. He served in this post until 1816.

After he resigned as president of the University of Georgia, Brown became pastor of Mt. Zion Church in Hancock County, Georgia. He ministered to this congregation for the next twelve years. Next, he was pastor at the Washington (GA) Presbyterian church before he began missionary work in the south Georgia frontier near Fort Gaines in Clay County, Georgia.

Brown died on December 11, 1842, in Fort Gaines. He is buried in the Old Pioneer Cemetery, alongside his wife of 48 years.

Preceded by Josiah Meigs	President of the University of Georgia; 1811 – 1816	Succeeded by Robert Finley
