= Uplift Humanity India =

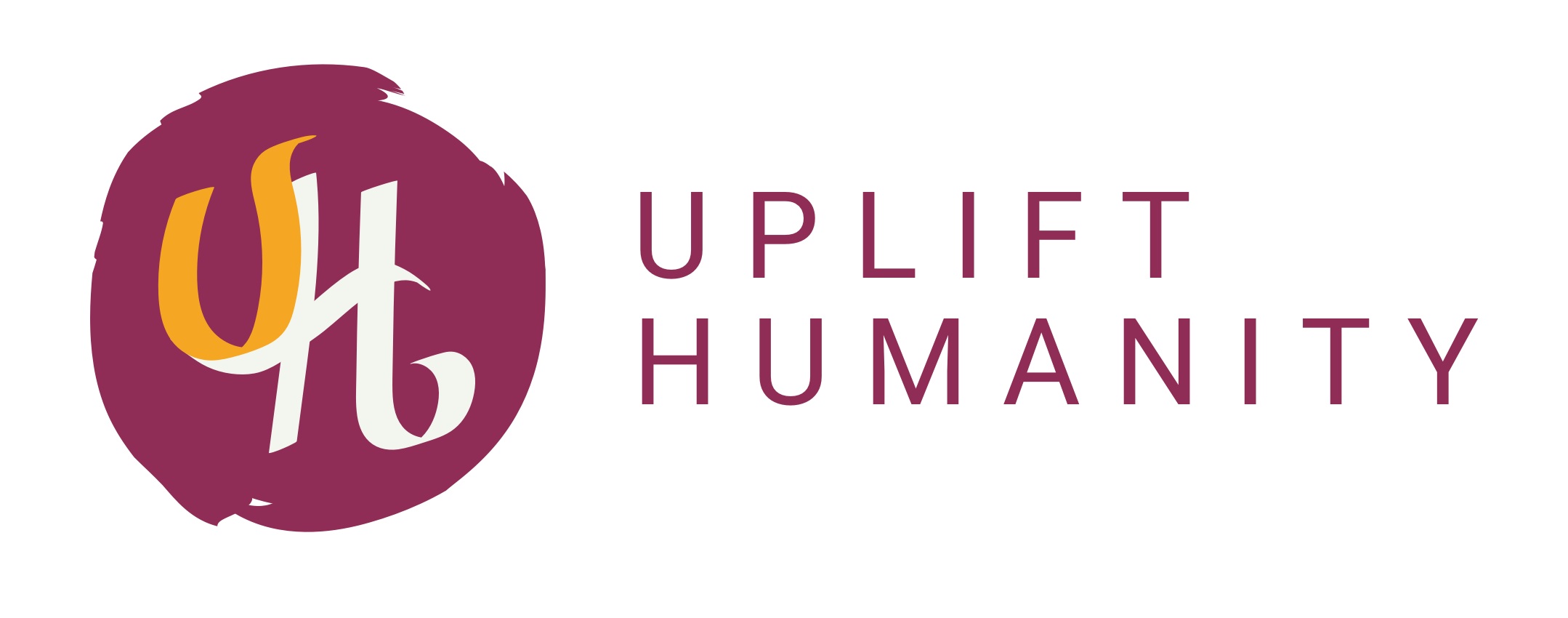
- Founded: September 2010
- Founder: Anish Patel
- Purpose: Education
- Location: Basking Ridge, New Jersey, United States
- Region served: Mumbai, Gujarat, and Hyderabad, India
- Key people: Anish Patel (Founder & CEO); Sejal Jain (COO); Martin Barrow (Director of Strategy)
- Employees: 35
- Website: uplifthumanityindia.org

Uplift Humanity India is a 501(c)(3) non-profit organization that operates rehabilitation programs throughout India to educate juveniles, needy and orphans in life skills and technology training. Uplift Humanity India is headquartered in Basking Ridge, New Jersey, and runs its programs in Mumbai, Gujarat, and Hyderabad. It was founded by Anish Patel in 2010 as a project to connect American students to at-risk youth in India.

== Programs ==
=== Rehabilitation Initiative ===
Uplift Humanity India works with Indian-American teachers in the United States to write its curriculum used for teaching children in India. The latest curriculum, titled "A Look To The Future," features lessons in life skills, self-esteem, honesty, and other values that have enabled juveniles to secure steady jobs and futures. The organization also uses an older version of the curriculum titled "One Step Forward" in some of its locations. Students who previously committed minor crimes and participated in Uplift Humanity India's programs have started earning steady incomes. Starting in 2012, family planning and women's rights were added to the curriculum.

Each summer, Uplift Humanity India sends groups of high school and college students selected from across the United States to one of its programs in India. Once there, the students learn the specifics of the curriculum and start teaching in small groups in observation homes for about one month. Lessons are not conducted in a lecture format - rather, teaching is done in a participative manner that involves role playing, games, and video-based lessons.

Beginning in 2011 at the Bal Gokulam facility in Vadodara, the rehabilitation initiative has since expanded to juvenile centers in New Delhi, Indore and Hyderabad.

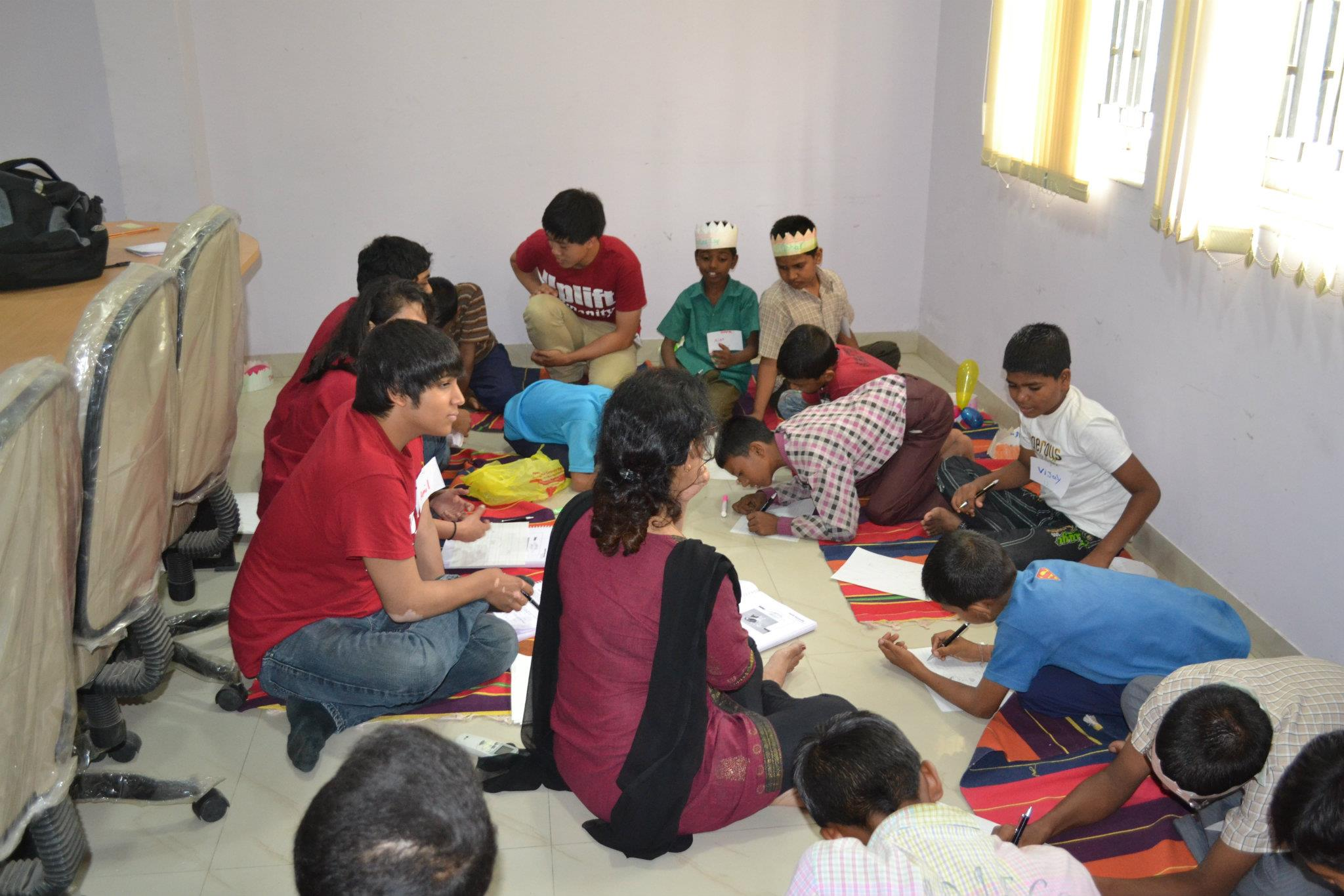
Uplift volunteers working with juveniles in 2012

=== Uplift Continuation Program ===
In August 2013, Uplift Humanity India announced the launch of its Uplift Continuation Program beginning in October, which will provide continuing educational support to the children in the observation homes throughout the year. This effectively extends the program so that juveniles and orphans can receive training even when the American students are not visiting in the summer. These programs contain technology trends and vocational skills training to help the children find a career in the future.

=== Other programs ===
Uplift Humanity India's Books Behind Bars program has donated more than 1000 books to jails in Newark, New Jersey and observation homes in India. The organization sponsors book donation drives in New Jersey each year to contribute to this cause.

Uplift Humanity India has also donated computer systems to the observation homes along with school supplies to supplement its curriculum.

Every year, as part of its summer program, the organization also offers educational scholarships to the students performing well. These scholarships are used for continuing education and to help the children pursue job or career training. To date, the scholarships have totaled 1.5 lakh Rupees.

== Recognition ==
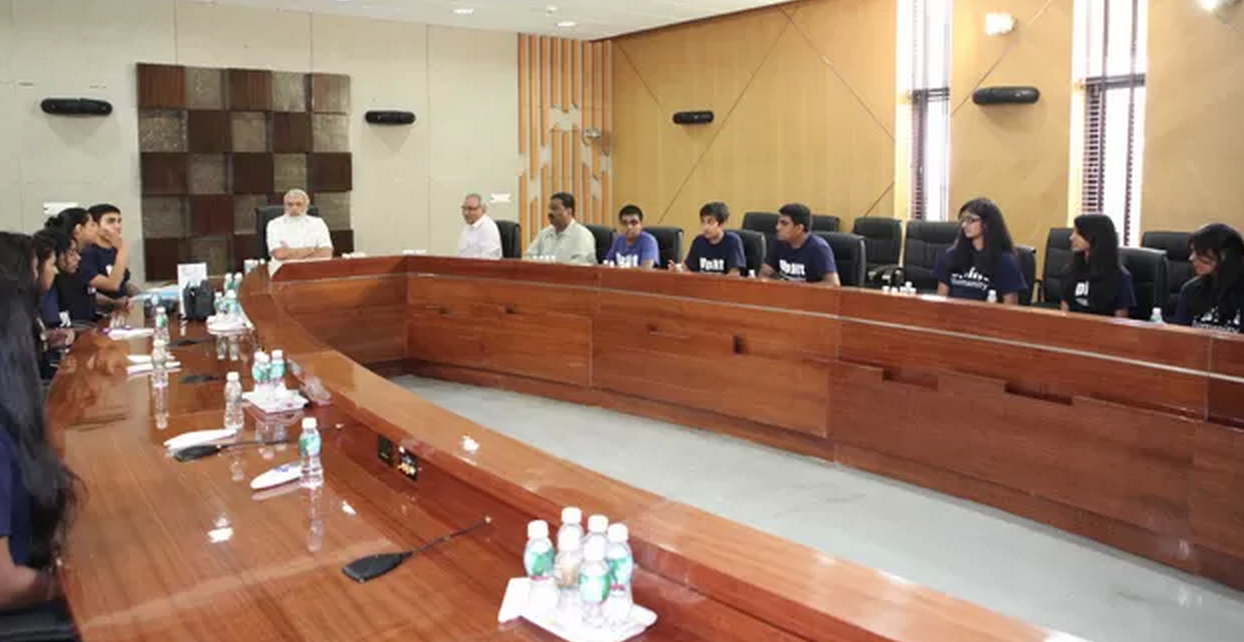
Uplift students meeting with Prime Minister of India Narendra Modi

Uplift Humanity India has received awards and recognition from Lions Club International and the New Jersey State Assembly for its efforts. Recently, it has been honored by Narendra Modi, the Prime Minister of India, who has joined Uplift Humanity India's rehabilitation programs in their cause.

In 2014, Uplift Humanity signed on actor Sunkrish Bala as its official brand ambassador. In January 2014, it released a YouTube video with Hollywood Actors Hannah Simone, Rizwan Manji, Gulshan Grover, and Sunkrish Bala spreading awareness and encouraging American youth to volunteer with the organization. The Times of India released an article stating that "the video featuring these actors went viral and hundreds of Americans applied to become a part of this programme."

== See also ==
- Social entrepreneurship
- Vocational rehabilitation
