= Presbyterian Church in Basking Ridge =

Historic church in New Jersey, United States

- U.S. National Register of Historic Places
- New Jersey Register of Historic Places
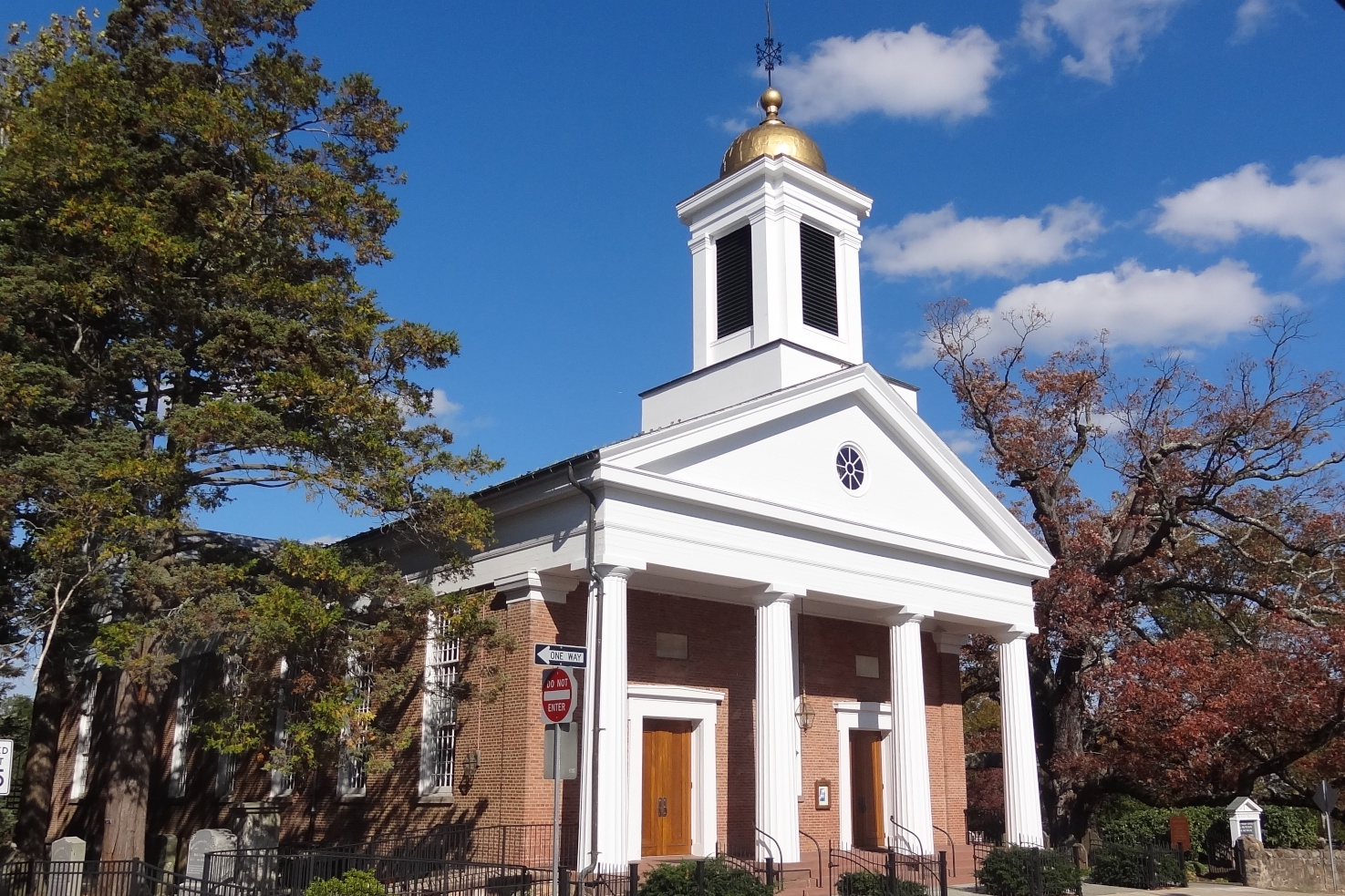
- Church and White Oak Tree to the right, in 2013

- Location within Somerset County, New Jersey Location within New Jersey Location within the United States
- Location: 1 E. Oak Street, Basking Ridge, New Jersey
- Coordinates: 40°42′26″N 74°32′39″W
- Area: 1.1 acres (0.45 ha)
- Built: 1839
- Architectural style: Greek Revival
- NRHP reference No.: 74001190
- NJRHP No.: 2470

Significant dates
- Added to NRHP: December 31, 1974
- Designated NJRHP: October 24, 1974

The Presbyterian Church in Basking Ridge is a historic church at 1 E. Oak Street in the Basking Ridge section of Bernards Township in Somerset County, New Jersey, United States. The church congregation was founded in 1717. The present church, which was constructed in 1839 in a Greek Revival style, is listed in the U.S. National Register of Historic Places. Until 2017, the churchyard held the Old Oak Tree of Basking Ridge, which was estimated to be 600 years old.

== Old Oak Tree ==
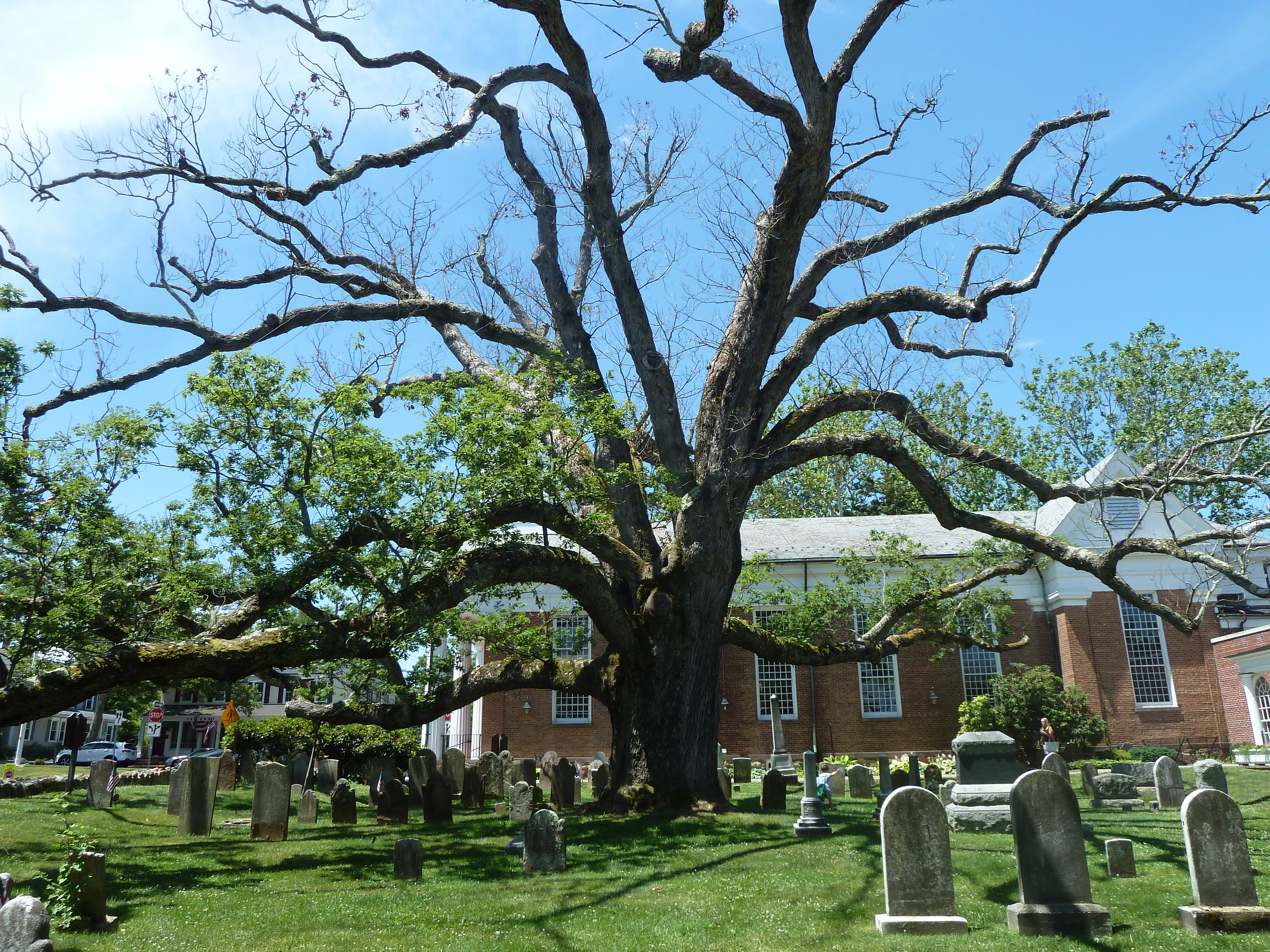
600 year-old "Holy Oak", June 2016

In the historical graveyard of the church stood a white oak, sometimes called the "Holy Oak", until 2017. It was 619 years old, possibly the oldest white oak in the world. It was nearly 100 feet (30 m) tall and had a spread of more than 130 feet (40 m). It had a trunk circumference of 20 feet (6.1 m) and its lower branches were supported.

English evangelist George Whitfield and American clergyman James Davenport, preached under the tree on November 5, 1740, to a crowd of 3,000, in the First Great Awakening. George Washington's troops were drilled on the village green, within view, and Washington picnicked under the tree with the Marquis de LaFayette. The 5,500 French troops of Jean-Baptiste Donatien de Vimeur, comte de Rochambeau marched by in 1781, on their route to Yorktown, Virginia and the decisive battle of the American Revolutionary War.

In June 2016, the tree was "failing to thrive" and showed signs of distress as its upper parts failed to sprout leaves. By September 2016, the tree had died. The tree was taken down over three days with the work finished on April 26, 2017. A young white oak grown from an acorn of the old tree has been planted in the churchyard.

The new biggest tree in New Jersey is identified as another white oak tree in the yard of the Sparta Historical Association of Sparta, New Jersey.

== Building ==
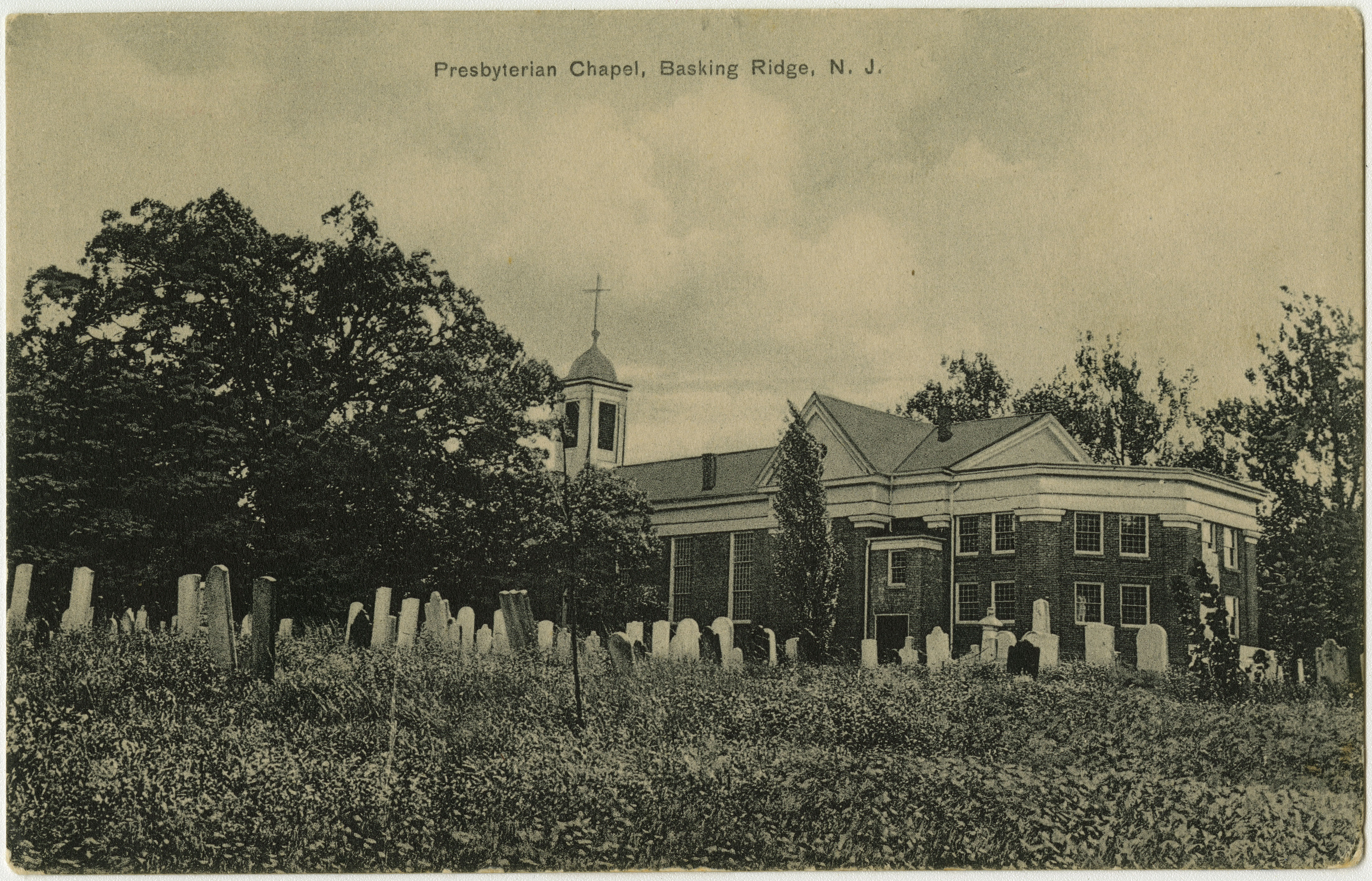
Oak tree and church, on pre-1923 postcard

The church building is 72 feet (22 m) by 46 feet (14 m), with a stone masonry foundation and red brick walls. The long side of the church has five windows 14 feet (4.3 m) tall and 5 feet (1.5 m) wide, with 30 over 30 over 30 glass panes in three sashes. As of 1974, much of the glass seemed to be original.

The Historic American Buildings Survey inventoried the church in 1939.It was added to the National Register of Historic Places in 1974.

== See also ==
- List of historic sites preserved along Rochambeau's route
- Arbutus Oak
- Church Website
