= Charles Delucena Meigs =

American obstetrician (1792–1869)

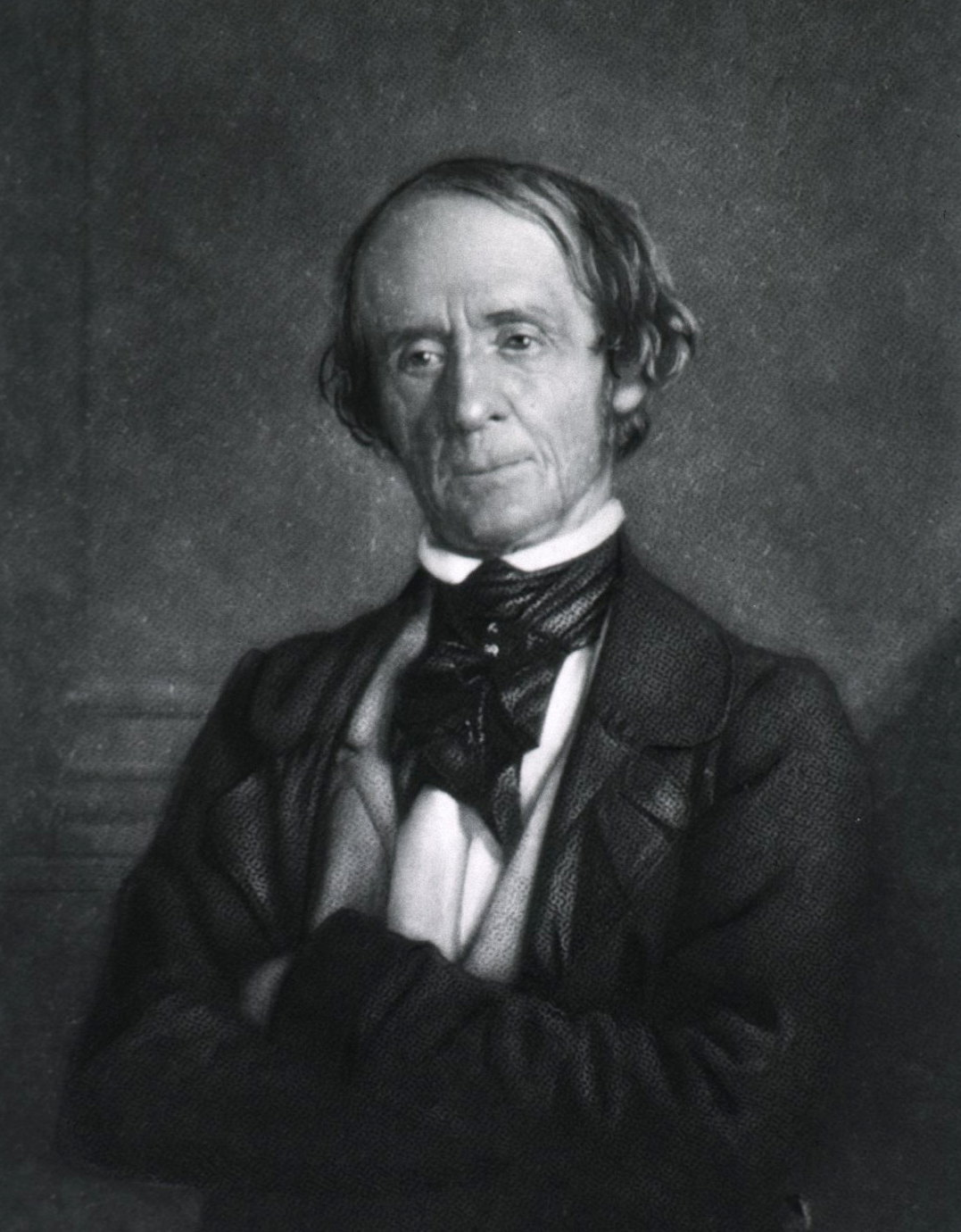
- Born: February 19, 1792; St. George, Bermuda
- Died: June 22, 1869 (aged 77); Philadelphia, Pennsylvania, U.S.
- Resting place: Laurel Hill Cemetery, Philadelphia, Pennsylvania, U.S.
- Known for: Obstetrics
- Scientific career
- Institutions: Jefferson Medical College

Charles Delucena Meigs (/ˈmiːɡz/ MEEGZ; February 19, 1792 – June 22, 1869) was an American obstetrician who worked as chair of obstetrics and diseases of women at Jefferson Medical College from 1841 to 1861. He worked as editor of The North American Medical and Surgical Journal and published multiple papers and books on various topics in obstetrics including thrombosis as a cause of sudden death in women during childbirth, diseases of the cervix and postpartum infections. He was a fellow of the College of Physicians of Philadelphia and served as president from 1845 to 1855.

He was opposed to two of the major obstetrical advances of the 19th century. He advocated against the usage of anesthesia during childbirth due to concerns that it would interfere with uterine contractions. He also argued against the ability of postpartum infections to be spread by the hands of physicians.

== Early life and education ==
Meigs was born February 19, 1792, in St. George, Bermuda, the fifth of ten children of Josiah Meigs and Clara Benjamin Meigs. In 1794, he relocated with his family to New Haven, Connecticut, where his father was a professor at Yale University. In 1801, he relocated with his family to Athens, Georgia, and attended a grammar school. He received his undergraduate degree from the University of Georgia in 1809 and his M.D. from the University of Pennsylvania in 1817. In 1818 he was awarded an honorary degree of M.D. from Princeton University.

== Career ==
Meigs returned to Georgia for a brief time to practice medicine, however his wife insisted they return to Philadelphia due to her disgust at the harsh treatment of enslaved people in that state.

In 1826, he worked as an editor for The North American Medical and Surgical Journal and in 1838, published his own book, Philadelphia Practice of Midwifery.

Meigs specialized in obstetrics and focused his research on the study of thrombosis as a cause of sudden death in women during childbirth. He also published papers on diseases of the cervix and child-bed fever. He was a fellow in the College of Physicians of Philadelphia and served as president from 1845 to 1855.

He held strong religious convictions and was described as having a "lofty belief that he had become a ministering spirit endowed with almost apostolic powers for those who placed themselves under his care".

He was active as a translator from French. He translated and published Alfred-Armand-Louis-Marie Velpeau's Elementary Treatise on Midwifery. His translation of Gobineau's Typhaines Abbey was published in 1869. He studied German and became proficient enough to read the papers of important German obstetricians.

In 1826, Meigs was elected as a member of the American Philosophical Society.

In 1832, Meigs received a silver pitcher from the Philadelphia City Council in recognition for his role in treating the cholera epidemic that hit the city.

Meigs applied for the chair of midwifery at the University of Pennsylvania after the retirement of William Potts Dewees, but lost out to another candidate. In 1841, he became chair of obstetrics and diseases of women at Jefferson Medical College, until his retirement in 1861. He was incorrect in his views on two of the major advances in obstetrics in the 19th century, the usage of anesthesia and sanitary practices to prevent the transmission of postpartum infections.

=== Opposition to anesthesia ===
He was an opposed to the usage of anesthesia on patients, especially in obstetrics. It was a widely held belief at the time that anesthesia would interfere with uterine contractions during birth. He believed that labor pains were "a most desireable, salutory and conservative manifestation of the life force". In 1856, he warned against the morally "doubtful nature of any process that the physicians set up to contravene the operations of those natural and physiological forces that the Divinity has ordained us to enjoy or to suffer".

=== Views on sanitary practices ===
He vehemently disagreed with Oliver Wendell-Holmes Sr. that puerperal fever was contagious and could be spread by physicians from patient to patient. He wrote in his publication "On The Nature, Signs, and Treatment of Childbed Fevers" and stated, "Did he carry it on his hands ? But a gentleman's hands are clean".

These beliefs resulted in his treatment of multiple women throughout the day without washing equipment or his hands between patients. He was known to wear the same medical frock all day no matter how soiled it became.

== Personal life ==
He was married to Mary Montogomery and together they had 10 children. One of their sons, Montgomery C. Meigs, achieved distinction as Quartermaster General of the U.S. Army during the American Civil War.

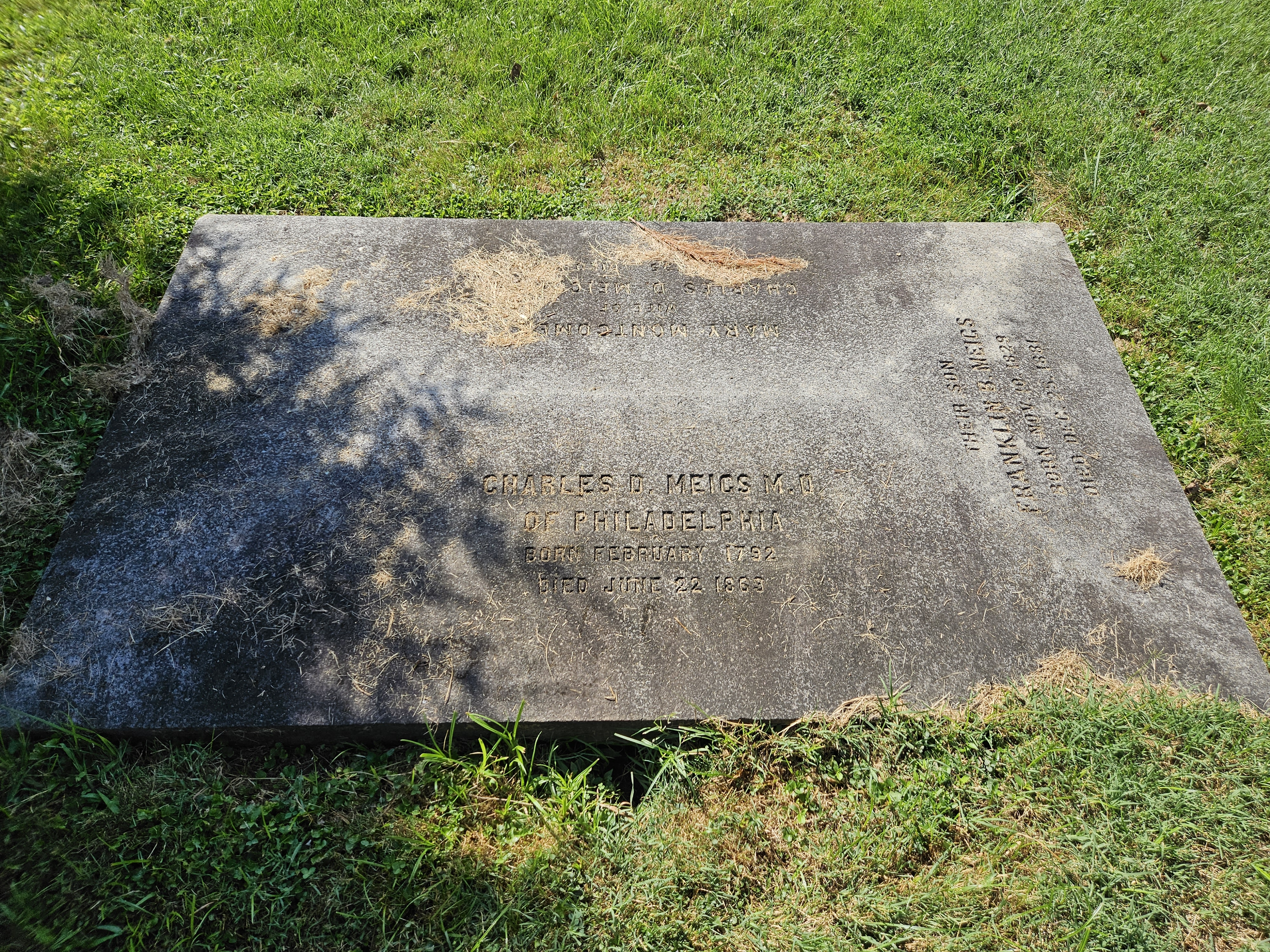
Charles Delucena Meigs' grave in Laurel Hill Cemetery

He died June 22, 1869, in Philadelphia, Pennsylvania and was interred at Laurel Hill Cemetery, Philadelphia, in Section I, Plot 71.

== Published works ==
- The Philadelphia Practice of Midwifery, James Kay, Jun. & Brother, Philadelphia, 1838
- An Introductory Lecture Delivered to the Class of Midwifery and Diseases of Women and Children in Jefferson Medical College, October 18th, 1848, C. Sherman, Philadelphia, 1848
- Females and Their Diseases; A Series of Letters to His Class, Blanchard and Lea, Philadelphia, 1848

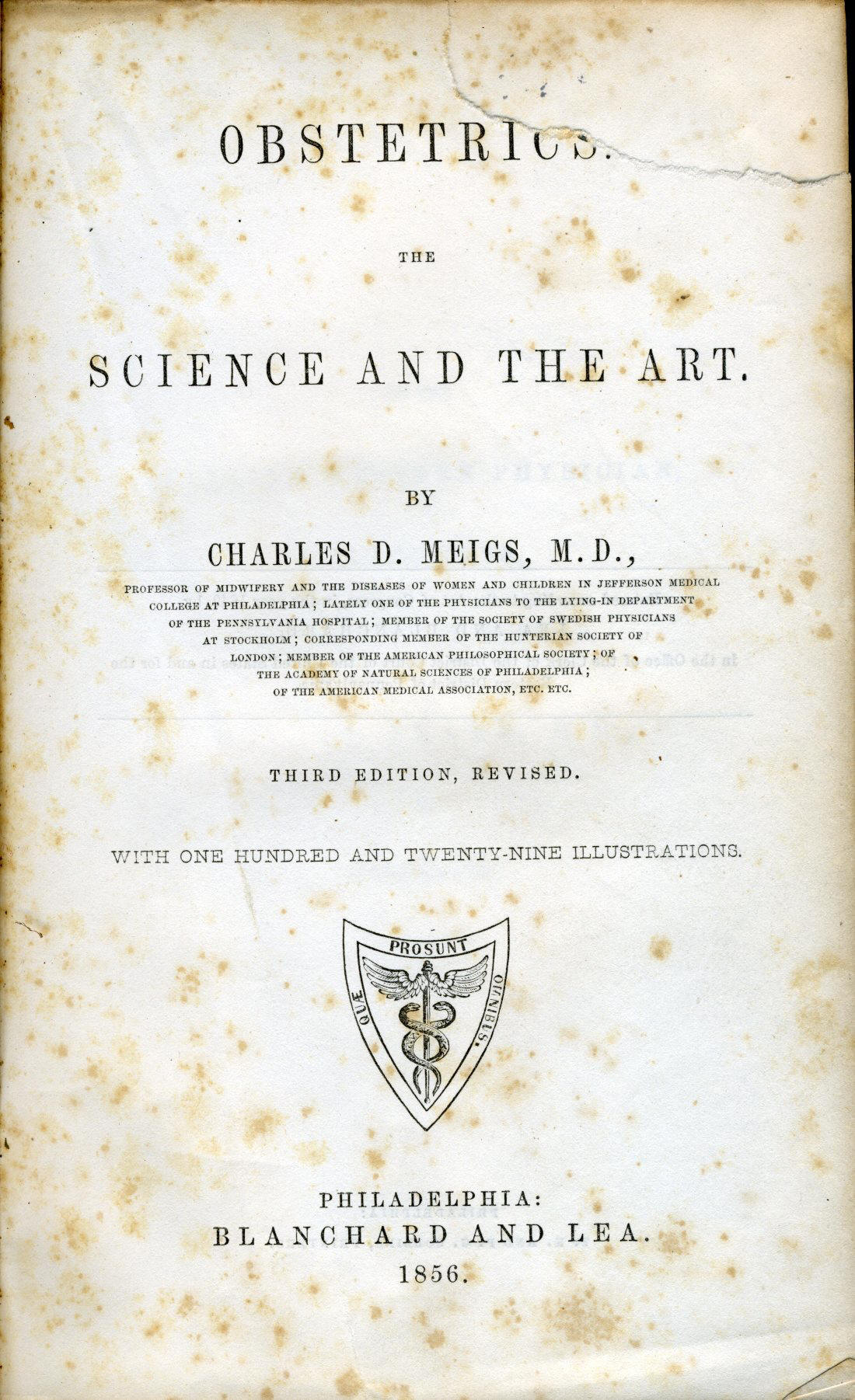
Charles Delucena Meigs' "Obstetrics. The Science and the Art", 3rd ed 1856

- Obstetrics: The Science and the Art, Lea and Blanchard, Philadelphia, 1849
- A Memoir of Samuel George Morton, M.D., Late President of the Academy of Natural Sciences of Philadelphia, T.K. and P.G. Collins, Philadelphia, 1851
- Woman; Her Diseases and Remedies. A Series of Letters to His Class, Lea and Blanchard, Philadelphia, 1851
- A Biographical Notice of Daniel Drake, M.D., of Cincinnati, Lippincott, Grambo, and Co., 1853
- A Treatise on Acute and Chronic Diseases of the Neck of the Uterus, Blanchard and Lea, Philadelphia, 1854
- On the Nature, Signs, and Treatment of Childbed Fevers: In a Series of Letters Addressed to the Students of His Class, Blanchard and Lea, Philadelphia, 1854
- Treatise on Obstetrics: The Science and Art, Blanchard and Lea, Philadelphia, 1867
