= Sheila Lumpe =

American politician

Member of the Missouri House of Representatives from the 72nd district
- In office January 6, 1993 – May 15, 1997
- Preceded by: Laurie Donovan
- Succeeded by: Betty Thompson

Member of the Missouri House of Representatives from the 88th district
- In office January 5, 1983 – January 6, 1993
- Preceded by: James N. Riley
- Succeeded by: Stephen Banton

Member of the Missouri House of Representatives from the 77th district
- In office January 7, 1981 – January 5, 1983
- Preceded by: Ken Rothman
- Succeeded by: Bob Feigenbaum

Personal details
- Born: April 17, 1935 York, Pennsylvania
- Died: June 4, 2014 (aged 79) University City, Missouri
- Party: Democratic

Sheila Lumpe (April 17, 1935 – June 4, 2014) was an American politician who served in the Missouri House of Representatives from 1981 to 1997.

She died of Alzheimer's disease on June 4, 2014, in University City, Missouri at age 79.
