= Brick Academy =

- Basking Ridge Classical School
- U.S. National Register of Historic Places
- New Jersey Register of Historic Places
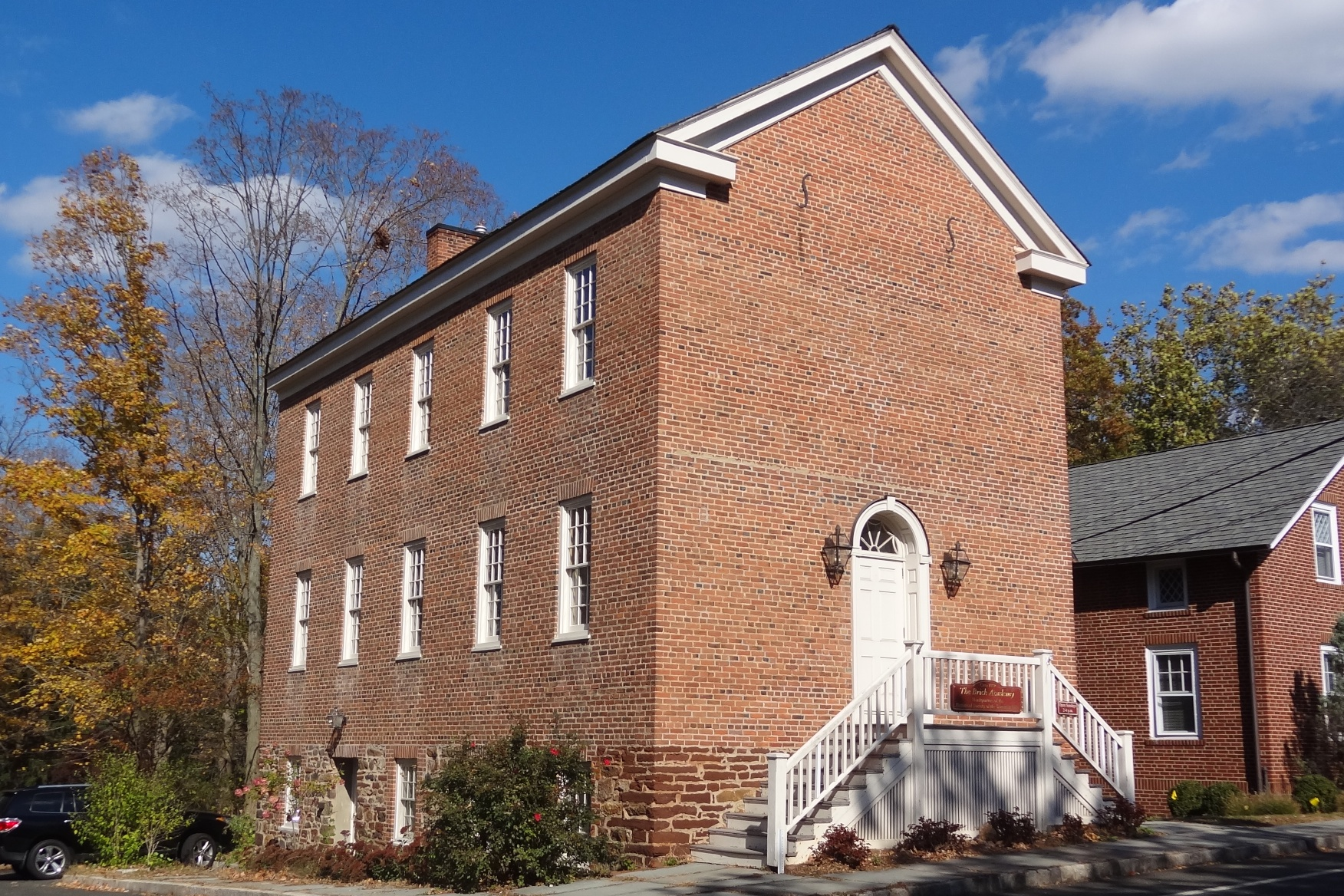
- The Brick Academy

- Location within Somerset County, New Jersey Location within New Jersey Location within the United States
- Location: 15 W. Oak Street; Basking Ridge, New Jersey
- Coordinates: 40°42′24″N 74°33′0″W
- Area: 0.5 acres (0.20 ha)
- Built: 1809
- Architectural style: Federal
- NRHP reference No.: 76001185
- NJRHP No.: 2467

Significant dates
- Added to NRHP: July 21, 1976
- Designated NJRHP: November 25, 1975

Brick Academy is the nickname for a Federal-style brick building built in 1809 to meet the growing needs of the Basking Ridge Classical School located in the Basking Ridge section of Bernards Township, Somerset County, New Jersey. That school existed prior to 1799, at least 10 years before the construction of this building in 1809. The brick building was constructed for the elementary school run by local Presbyterian pastor, Rev. Robert Finley. This was about halfway through Rev. Finley's time at Basking Ridge. During the time he ran the school, attendance grew from fewer than 12 to an average near 25 students, and sometimes as high as 40 students. Students came from near & far, mostly from prominent families. The school was a high end preparatory school for boys who generally continued on to the College of New Jersey, later (in 1896), known as Princeton University. In 1817, Rev. Finley quit Basking Ridge to briefly become president of the University of Georgia in Athens, GA. By 1828, the "Brick Academy" corporation was formed and the building continued use as a private, then public school in 1853, before being used for other purposes.

The nickname "Brick Academy" is often misused to include students who actually attended the "Basking Ridge Classical School" (prior to 1828). It is also used inappropriately to include students at that school prior to the construction of the brick building, later known as "the Brick Academy". Samuel Southard is frequently cited as having attended the "Brick Academy" in Basking Ridge, however he graduated Princeton in 1804 - fully 5 years prior to the construction of the brick building later known as the Brick Academy.

After many years of service as a private boys' school, the Brick Academy later served as a public school, and then as a meeting hall for several fraternal and benevolent organizations, and the Bernards Township municipal building. (See timeline below.) In 1976 the Township leased the Brick Academy to The Historical Society of the Somerset Hills which uses the historic building for its headquarters and public meetings, and operates a museum, one room schoolhouse for local history, and research room.

The building was added to the National Register of Historic Places on July 21, 1976 for its significance in education, philosophy, and religion.

== Notable students ==
- Samuel Lewis Southard (1787-1842), served as U.S. Senator, Secretary of the Navy, and the 10th Governor of New Jersey.
- Theodore Frelinghuysen, United States Senator, Whig candidate for Vice President in 1844, and president of Rutgers College
- William Lewis Dayton, United States Senator, Republican candidate for Vice President in 1856, and Minister to France during the Civil War
- Commodore Robert Field Stockton, hero of the Mexican War

== Timeline ==
1795-8 Basking Ridge Classical School founded(?) by Reverend Robert Finley with students boarding locally or with Dr. Finley
1809 Brick Academy is constructed as the home of the Basking Ridge Classical School
1817 Rev Finley leaves NJ and travels to Athens GA to become president of University of Georgia, about a month before his death.
1828 Basking Ridge Brick Academy Company incorporated
1853 School District #12 in Basking Ridge opens in the Brick Academy building as a public school.
1896 College of New Jersey changes name to Princeton University as part of the sesquicentennial celebrations.
1904 The Brick Academy is sold to the Ancient Order of United Workmen (1904-1925) Junior Order of United American Mechanics
1924 Bernards Township, New Jersey rents building for municipal offices
1948 Bernards Township buys building for continued use for municipal offices
1975 Bernards Township government moves to former Astor estate at 1 Collyer Lane
1976 Township leases Brick Academy to The Historical Society of the Somerset Hills
1976 Brick Academy listed on National Register of Historic Places
2008 Dedication and opening of the top floor of the Brick Academy restoration effort. (November 11, 2008)
2009 Brick Academy Bicentennial celebration

== See also ==
- List of museums in New Jersey
