= James Davenport (clergyman) =

American clergyman (1716–1757)

- Born: 1716; Stamford, Connecticut
- Died: 1757 (aged 40–41); New Jersey
- Education: Yale College

James Davenport (1716–1757) was an American Congregational clergyman and itinerant preacher noted for his often controversial actions during the First Great Awakening.

== Background and early life ==
Davenport was born in Stamford, Connecticut, to an old Puritan family. Davenport’s great-grandfather, Reverend John Davenport, was a founder and first minister of New Haven. James attended Yale College where he was ranked at the top of the class in 1732. Davenport and his friends were determined to become preachers even though most Yale graduates were pursuing law, politics, or business.They started clubs that would attest the changing character of the Yale student body, and frequently found themselves in adversarial positions with the university. This is the beginning of Davenport's mistrust with established institutions. He was ordained as a minister by the Congregational Council of Southold, Long Island in October 26, 1738.

== Preaching career and controversies ==
Coat of Arms of James Davenport

It was around this time that he met Presbyterian revivalist Gilbert Tennent and English evangelical George Whitefield. The success of Whitefield's style of revival preaching convinced Davenport that God was calling him, and in 1741 - having by chance opened his Bible to 1 Samuel 14, where Jonathan and his armor-bearer attack the Philistine camp, and taken this as a sign - he left his congregation to become an itinerant. His actions during this time often caused him to run afoul of both ecclesiastical and civil authorities.

Davenport often denounced fellow clergymen for their conduct, such as when he labeled Joseph Noyes, the pastor of New Haven, a "wolf in sheep's clothing." Throughout New England he used this strategy, of condemning his fellow clergymen, to gain popularity.

Davenport is also noted for his "Bonfires of the Vanities", the public burnings he organized in New London. As with those of Girolamo Savonarola, Davenport urged his followers to destroy immoral books and luxury items with fire. He often said that he could distinguish people who were saved versus people who were damned just by looking at them.

In June 1742, Davenport and fellow preacher Benjamin Pomeroy were arraigned before the Colonial Assembly at Hartford, Connecticut, charged with disorderly conduct. Pomeroy's case was dismissed, but Davenport was declared to be under "enthusiastical impressions and impulses, and thereby disturbed in the rational faculties of his mind." No punishment was meted out, but Davenport was sent back to his former parish of Southold.

On March 7, 1743, Davenport exhibited perhaps his most bizarre behavior yet, in an incident which garnished him lasting fame—or infamy. The day before, he had led a crowd to burn a large pile of books; this day he called them to throw their expensive and fancy clothing onto the fire, so as to prove their full commitment to God. Davenport—leading by example—removed his pants and cast them into the bonfire. One woman in the crowd quickly grabbed his pants out of the blaze, and handed them back to Davenport, entreating him to get a hold of himself. "This act broke Davenport's spell," wrote historian Thomas Kidd. Davenport had gone too far, charisma or no, and the crowd quickly dispersed.

After the bonfire ended, Davenport was charged with "having the devil in him", and he replied, "He tho't so too", and added "that he was under the Influence of an evil Spirit, and that God had left him" (49)

According to the Boston Weekly Post Boy of 28 March 1743, Davenport had exhibited signs of physical distress along with his unorthodox behavior, symptoms that at the time would have been interpreted as evidence of demonic possession. In 1744, after publicly acknowledging his missteps and apologizing to ministers around the colony, Davenport published a letter titled, "Confession and Retraction," appearing in pamphlets and in newspapers, including the publication Christian History. The letter claimed he had "fallen into the snare of the devil," confessing to being led astray by impulses and the "false spirit," and spoke of a desire to distinguish the “Appendage from the Substance or Essence, that which is vile and odious from that which is precious, glorious, and divine” (Davenport).

== Later life ==
In the late 1740s and 50s, Davenport struggled to reposition himself in the clerical mainstream. It was hard for him to convince his fellow ministers that he could be taken seriously after being judged insane by two tribunals in Connecticut and Massachusetts in 1742. Moving to Plainfield Connecticut in 1744 as a supply minister proved difficult, as he departed in 1745, unable to find support from the Old and New Lights of the area, receiving criticism from both sides.

In 1749 the New York Synod appointed him to a committee that assigned visiting clerics to northern colonies. Though his career saw improvements in 1750 as a minister in Hanover, Virginia, his preaching differed from that of his earlier sermons—less fiery, less experimental, and without song.

On 27 October 1754, Davenport became pastor of Maidenhead and Hopewell, New Jersey, an office he held until his death on 10 November 1757. He was buried in the Old Cemetery lot of the Pennington (N.J.) Presbyterian Church.

== See also ==
- George Whitefield — Contemporary itinerant preacher during the Great Awakening
- Jonathan Edwards — Contemporary clergyman during the Great Awakening
