= Basking Ridge, New Jersey =

Populated place in Somerset County, New Jersey, US

- Census-designated place
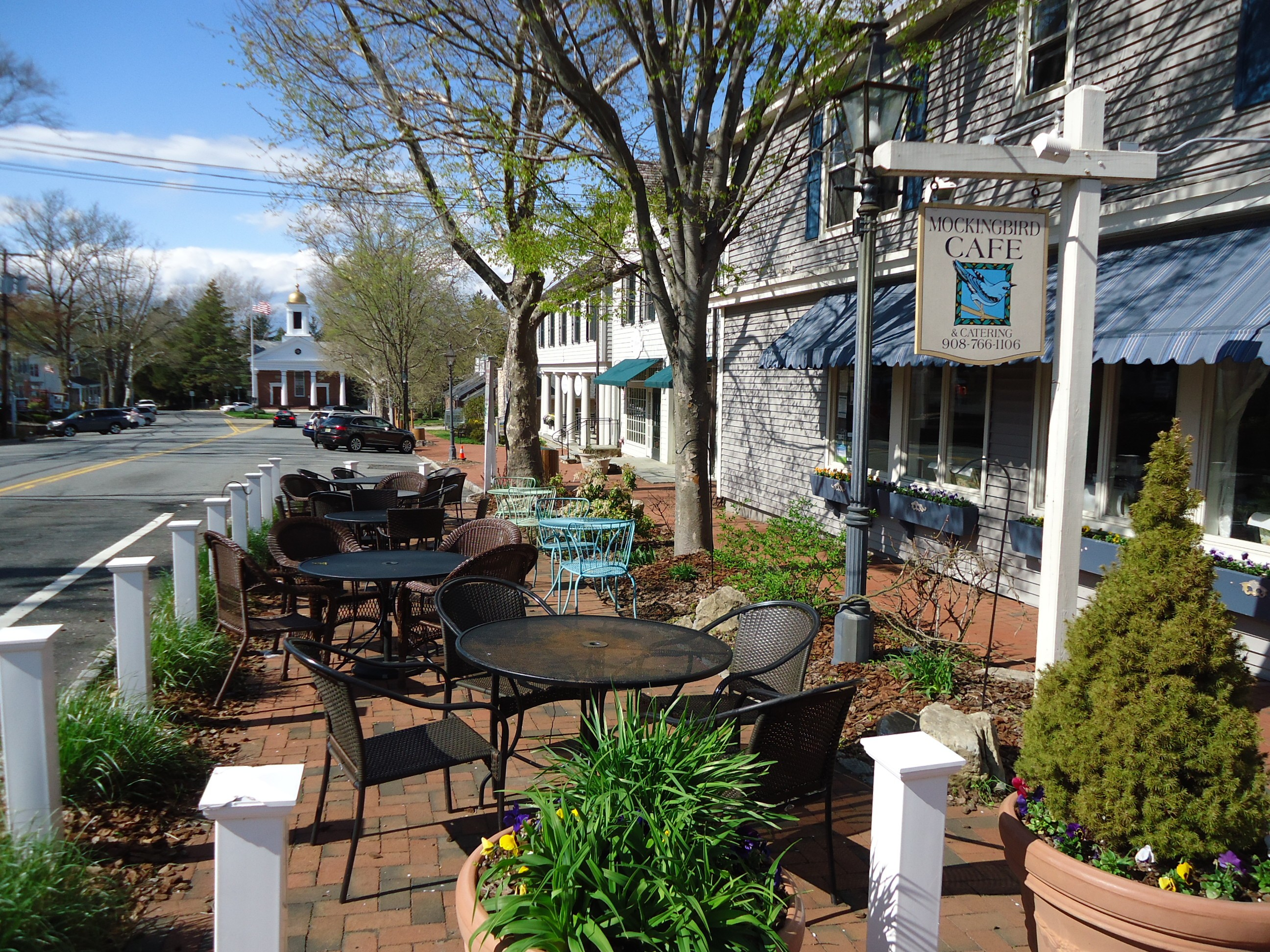
- Street scene in Basking Ridge

- Location in Somerset County Location in New Jersey Location in the United States
- Coordinates: 40.7062°N 74.5493°W
- Country: United States
- State: New Jersey
- County: Somerset
- Township: Bernards

Area
  - Total: 6.80 sq mi (17.60 km^{2})
  - Land: 6.75 sq mi (17.48 km^{2})
  - Water: 0.046 sq mi (0.12 km^{2})
- Elevation: 335 ft (102 m)

Population (2020)
  - Total: 7,196
  - Density: 1,066/sq mi (411.6/km^{2})
- Time zone: UTC−05:00 (Eastern (EST))
  - Summer (DST): UTC−04:00 (Eastern (EDT))
- ZIP Code: 07920, 07939
- Area code: 908
- FIPS code: 34-03340
- GNIS feature ID: 2806230

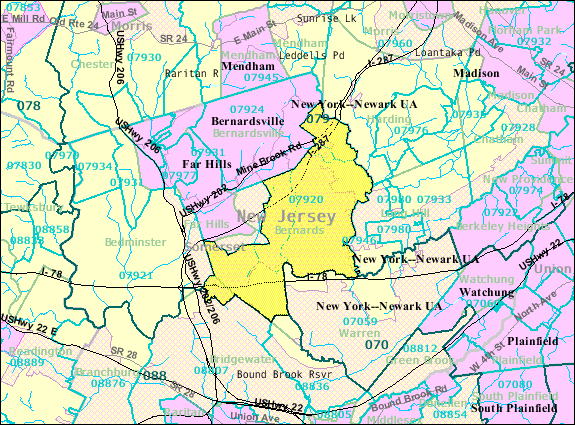
Map of Basking Ridge ZIP Code Tabulation Area (ZCTA) 07920

Basking Ridge is an unincorporated community and census-designated place (CDP) located within Bernards Township in the Somerset Hills region of Somerset County, in the U.S. state of New Jersey.

Settled during colonial times, Basking Ridge is in the Raritan Valley and is a commercial hub for northern-central New Jersey and is a commuter town of New York City. It was home to the old AT&T Headquarters, now operated by Verizon. Basking Ridge is the current headquarters for Verizon Wireless and Peraton Labs (both AT&T successors), Collabera, and Lawyer.com. The community also hosts a train station along the Gladstone Branch (one of the two branches of the Morris & Essex Lines), which connects to Hoboken Terminal and New York Penn Station.

The community of Basking Ridge is part of greater Bernards Township, which also includes the neighborhoods of Liberty Corner, Lyons and West Millington.

It was first listed as a CDP in the 2020 census with a population of 7,196.

== History ==
Basking Ridge was originally settled in the 1720s by British Presbyterians escaping religious persecution. The land was bought from the Lenape Native Americans.

Bernards Township was officially chartered on May 21, 1760, granted by King George II and granted to Sir Francis Bernard, first governor of the noted section which includes Basking Ridge.

On the morning of December 13, 1776, General Charles Lee was captured by the British at Widow White's tavern. Lee had ranked next to Washington in command.

A referendum to create an independent borough of Basking Ridge failed in June 1921. Voters rejected the proposed borough by a more than 4–1 margin.

The downtown area of Bernards Township known as Basking Ridge was added to the New Jersey and National Registries as a Historic District. on August 8, 1974.

== Demographics ==
Historical population
Census	Pop.	Note	%±
1950	1,899		—
1960	2,438		28.4%
2020	7,196		—
U.S. Decennial Census; 1950 1960 1970; 1980 1990 2000; 2010 2020

Basking Ridge appeared as an unincorporated place in the 1950 U.S. census and the 1960 U.S. census. It did not appear in subsequent censuses until it was listed as a census designated place in the 2020 U.S. census.

=== 2020 census ===
As of the 2020 census, Basking Ridge had a population of 7,196. The median age was 45.4 years. About 25.7% of residents were under the age of 18, and 18.1% were 65 years of age or older. For every 100 females there were 95.3 males, and for every 100 females age 18 and over there were 87.4 males age 18 and over.

According to the 2020 census, 96.2% of residents lived in urban areas and 3.8% lived in rural areas.

The census counted 2,579 households, of which 35.8% had children under the age of 18 living in them. Of all households, 63.5% were married-couple households, 10.6% were households with a male householder and no spouse or partner present, and 23.7% were households with a female householder and no spouse or partner present. About 24.1% of all households were made up of individuals, and 17.0% had someone living alone who was 65 years of age or older.

There were 2,706 housing units, of which 4.7% were vacant. The homeowner vacancy rate was 1.4% and the rental vacancy rate was 3.7%.

Basking Ridge CDP, New Jersey – Racial and ethnic composition Note: the US Census treats Hispanic/Latino as an ethnic category. This table excludes Latinos from the racial categories and assigns them to a separate category. Hispanics/Latinos may be of any race.
Race / Ethnicity (NH = Non-Hispanic)	Pop 2020	% 2020
White alone (NH)	5,666	78.74%
Black or African American alone (NH)	46	0.64%
Native American or Alaska Native alone (NH)	1	0.01%
Asian alone (NH)	671	9.32%
Native Hawaiian or Pacific Islander alone (NH)	0	0.00%
Other race alone (NH)	21	0.29%
Mixed race or Multiracial (NH)	272	3.78%
Hispanic or Latino (any race)	519	7.21%
Total	7,196	100.00%

=== 2010 census ===
Prior to 2020, demographic data was based on the United States Census Bureau figures for the ZIP Code Tabulation Area (ZCTA) for the 07920 ZIP Code. As of the 2010 census, the population for the ZIP Code Tabulation Area (ZCTA) 07920 was 26,747.

=== 2000 census ===
As of the 2000 United States census there were 24,600 people, 9,300 households, and 6,517 families residing in the ZCTA. The population density was 1,137.1 inhabitants per square mile (439.0/km^{2}). There were 9,537 housing units at an average density of 440.8 per square mile (170.2/km^{2}). The racial makeup of the ZCTA was 89.2% Caucasian, 1.4% African American, 0.1% Native American, 7.8% Asian, 0.0% Pacific Islander, 0.4% from other races, and 1.1% from two or more races. 2.6% of the population were Hispanic or Latino of any race.

There were 9,300 households, out of which 37.1% had children under the age of 18 living with them, 62.8% were married couples living together, 5.8% had a female householder with no husband present, and 29.9% were non-families. 26.5% of all households were made up of individuals, and 9.1% had someone living alone who was 65 years of age or older. The average household size was 2.56 and the average family size was 3.15.

In the ZCTA the population was spread out, with 27.3% under the age of 18, 3.2% from 18 to 24, 31.2% from 25 to 44, 25.4% from 45 to 64, and 12.7% who were 65 years of age or older. The median age was 39.3 years.

The median income for a household in the ZCTA was $105,471, and the median income for a family was $131,618. Males had a median income of $93,436 versus $60,101 for females. The per capita income for the ZCTA was $54,753. 1.4% of the population and 0.6% of families were below the poverty line. Out of the total population, 1.2% of those under the age of 18 and 2.8% of those 65 and older were living below the poverty line.

=== Demographic profile ===
Demographic	Basking Ridge	United States
Population	21,424	308,745,538
Median Age	37.13 years	37.2 years
Median Household Income	$183,611	$51,144
% of Single Households	37.39%	30.22%
% of Married Households	62.61%	69.78%
% Families	70.72%	69.40%
Avg. Household Size	2.42 people	2.58 people
% College or Higher	59.76%	26.46%
% White Collar	82.53%	55.54%
Homes Owner Occupied	79.84%	57.72%
Avg. Dwelling Size	6 rooms	4.5 rooms

== Arts and culture ==
=== Cultural events ===
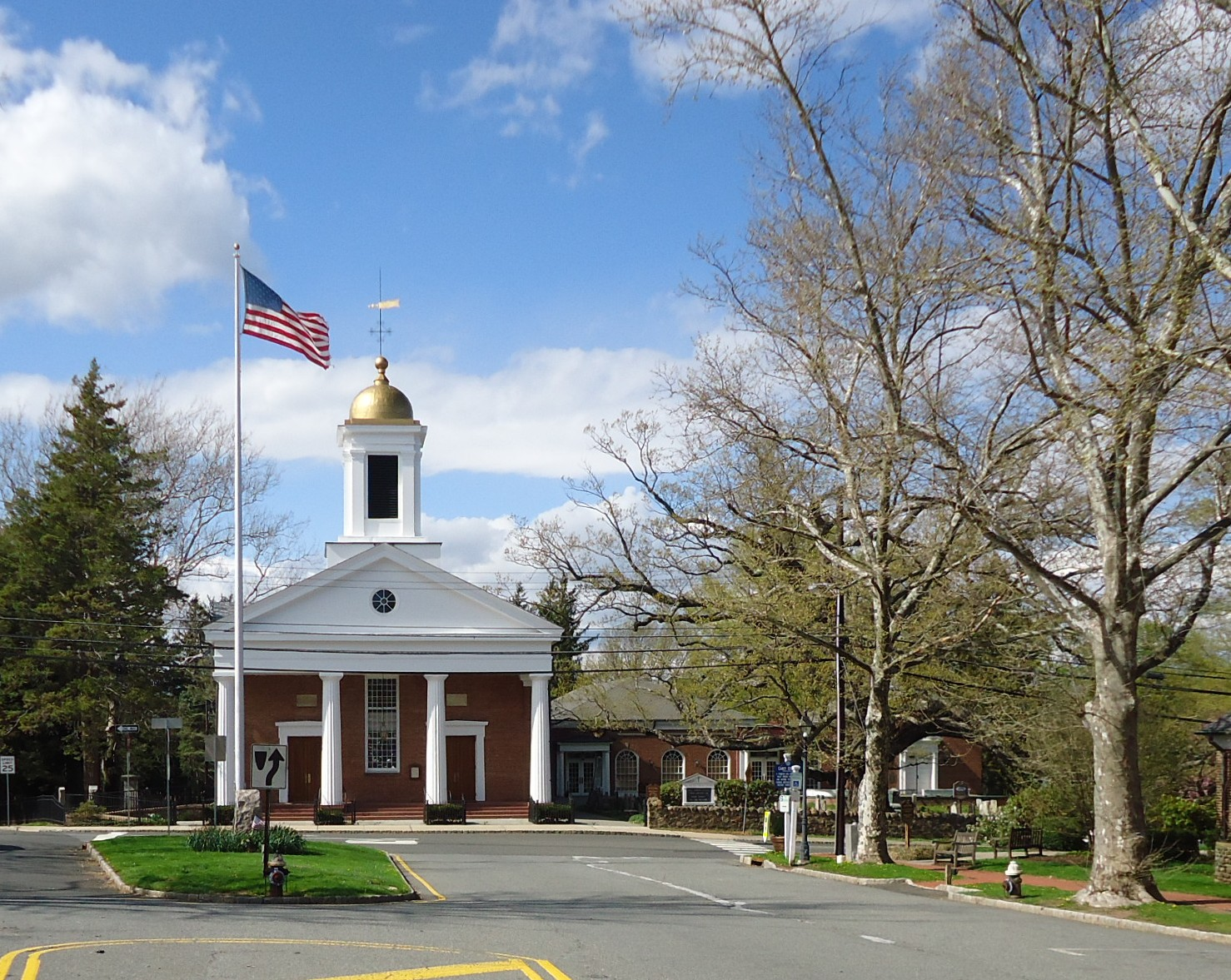
Downtown area with Presbyterian church in distance

Basking Ridge has an annual event in May called Charter Day. Many rides are set up in the Oak Street field—a bounce house, inflatable race tracks, and spinning rides. Also, in the center of the town hundreds of stands are set up mostly promoting school sports, but there are also many kettle corn stands, which is a traditional food children eat during Charter Day. At night, the traditional Battle of the Bands takes place, which many teenagers sign up for to play their favorite songs.

=== Historic sites ===
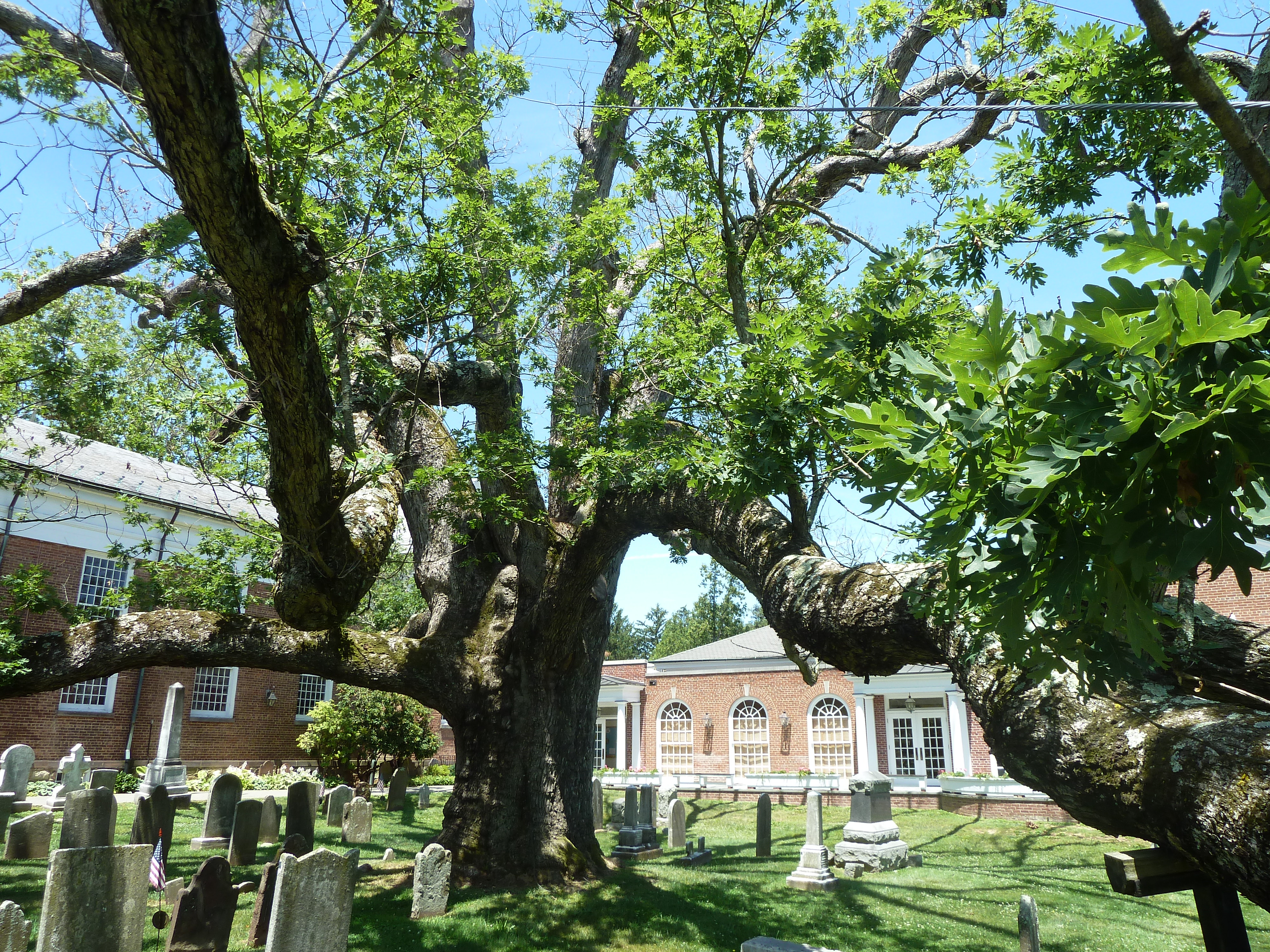
600 year-old historic oak tree in Basking Ridge, June 2016

- Basking Ridge was home to the Old Oak Tree, a 600-year-old white oak, perhaps the oldest white oak in the world. The tree was located on the historic graveyard of the local Presbyterian church. The tree was 97 feet (30 m) high and had a trunk circumference of 20 feet (6.1 m) and its lower branches were supported. In 2016 the tree showed signs of distress as its upper parts failed to sprout leaves. A big portion of the tree was cut down in 2017 due to decay. The tree has since been cut down as of April 26, 2017.
- A specially designed experimental hospital was built in 1779 by local resident John "Rebel Banker" Morton with the help of Dr. James Tilton in the winter of 1779-80. The hospital was built with three wards, that held patients in its hub and each of the three wards held eight patients. Patient beds were oriented so that their heads were closest to the walls of the buildings. When temperatures fell, a "fire was built in the midst of the ward, without any chimney, and the smoke circulating about, passed off through an opening about 4 inches wide in the ridge of the roof." Tilton described how the design of the building allowed infection to be fought using smoke, "without giving the least offense to the patient, for it always rose above their heads, before it spread abroad in the ward." This hospital, which could accommodate up to 55 patients, provided an uncrowded but fully ventilated space in which those with infectious disease could be kept apart from those who were wounded.
- The Bernards Township Municipal Hall was once owned by the Astors. The estate was built in 1912 by Samuel Owen of Newark, New Jersey.
- The Brick Academy was built in 1809 as the Basking Ridge Classical School; its function was to prepare young men for the College of New Jersey (now known as Princeton University). It has also served as a public school, a union hall, a public library, and the municipal hall for Bernards Township. It now serves as a historic museum for Basking Ridge and as the home of The Historical Society of the Somerset Hills.
- The Van Dorn Mill was built in 1768 as a wooden structure; it was rebuilt in 1843 with foundations extending 20 feet (6.1 m) below ground level, using thousands of stones hauled from the hedgerows of nearby farms.
- The Basking Ridge Presbyterian Church is a Greek Revival church built in 1839 and expanded in 1869, that is listed on the New Jersey Register of Historic Places and added to the National Register of Historic Places on December 31, 1974.
- The Devil's Tree is a solitary oak with some dead limbs growing in an undeveloped field on Mountain Road, opposite Emerald Valley Lane. Local legend, documented in Weird NJ magazine and the book based on it, tells that the tree is cursed or the property of the Devil and has been a site of lynchings by the Ku Klux Klan in the past.
- Alward Farm House is a Colonial era farmhouse representing the simple lifestyle of early settlers. Built c.1740, it is one of the first structures in Bernards Township. Entered in State and National Registers, 1986.

== National Register of Historic Places ==
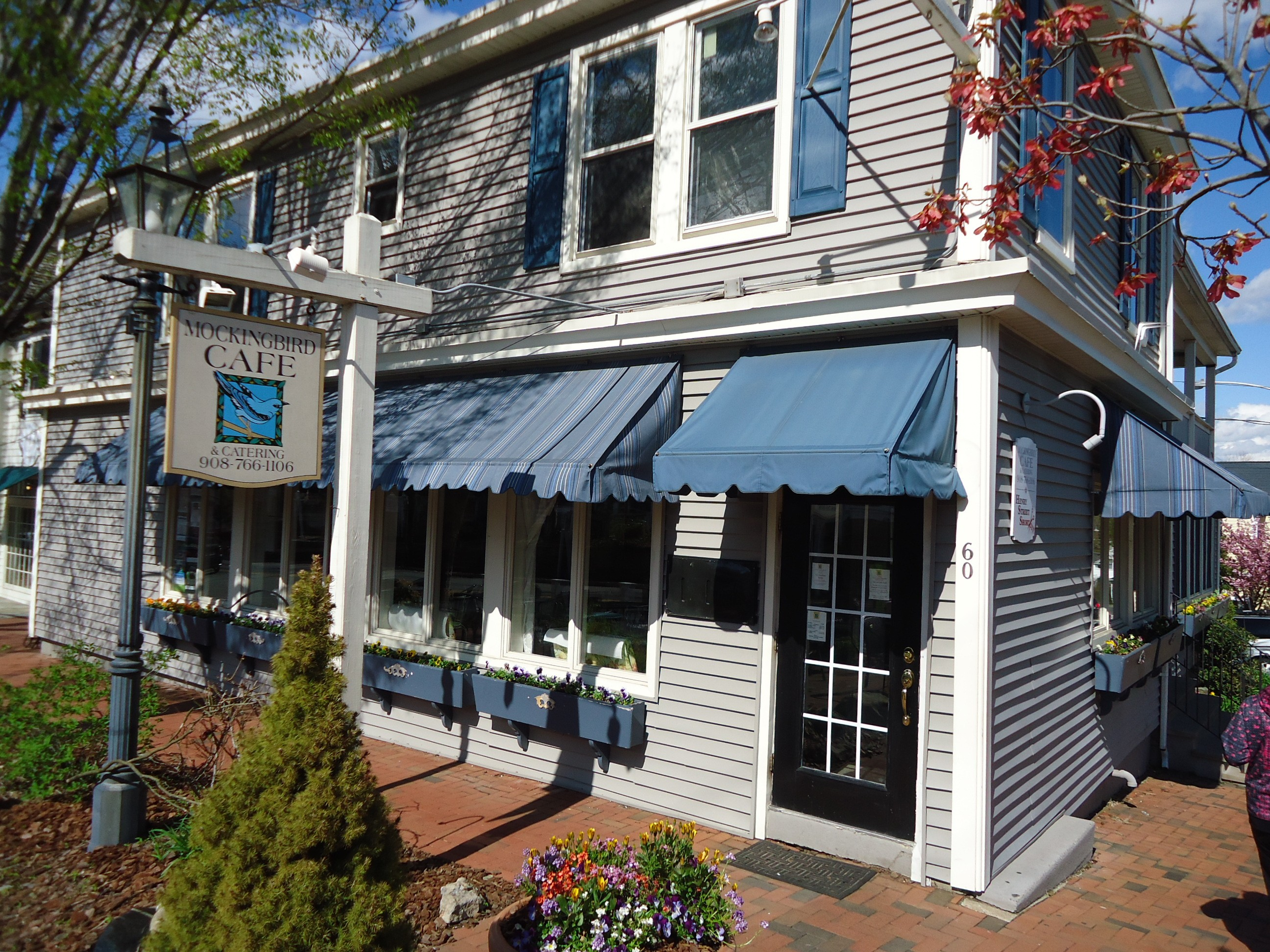
Cafe in the downtown area

Basking Ridge has several properties on the National Register of Historic Places.

- Alward Farmhouse, added March 13, 1986
- Basking Ridge Classical School, added July 21, 1976
- Coffee House, added November 7, 1977
- Presbyterian Church in Basking Ridge, added December 31, 1974
- Lord Stirling Manor Site, added June 22, 1978
- Basking Ridge Historic District, added August 8, 1974.

== Parks and recreation ==
There are several parks within Basking Ridge. Four are county parks: Lord Stirling Park, Rebel Hill, Southard, and Harry Dunham. The fifth is Pleasant Valley Park which contains the town pool and miles of woodchip trails.

== Education ==
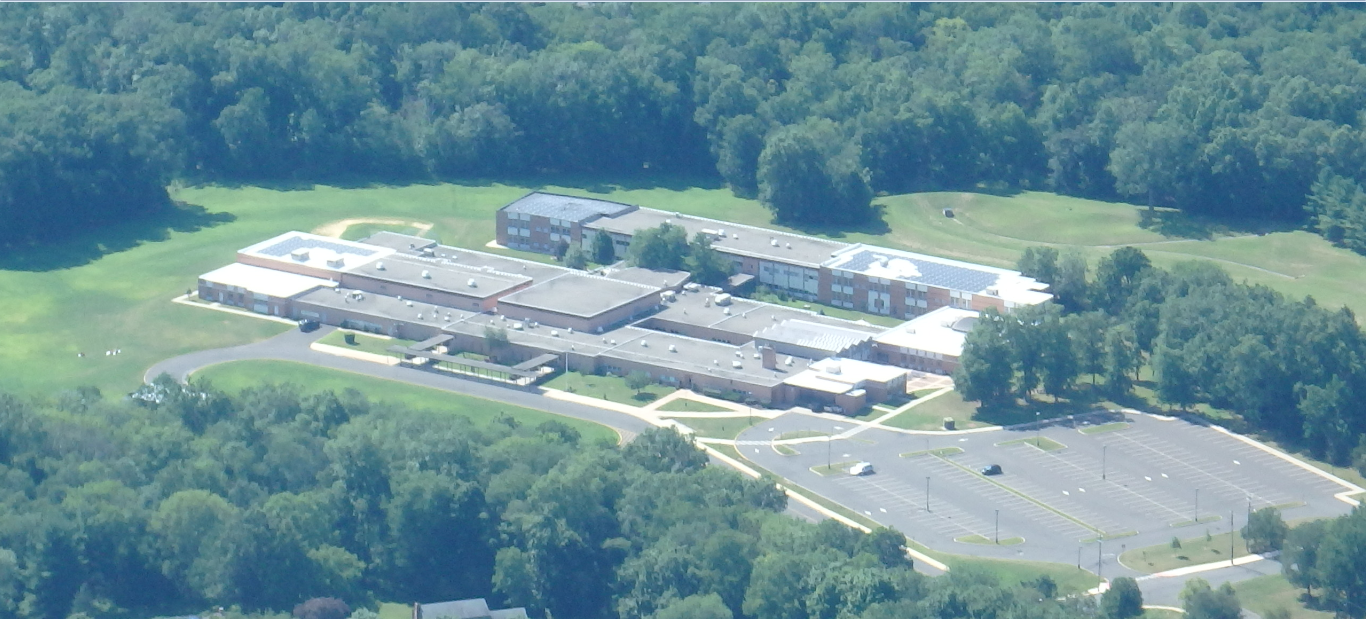
William Annin Middle School in Basking Ridge NJ

Bernards High School was founded by the Bernards Township Board of Education in 1924. When Bernardsville separated from Bernards Township, the schools still remained one system until 1947 when the original high school became the property of Bernardsville. From 1948, however, township students continued attending Bernards High School as tuition students. In 1960, a contract was issued for the construction of a new Ridge High School and Cedar Hill School which were built on approximately 60 acres (24 ha) of land.

William Annin Middle School was originally named after a colonial patriot who settled in Basking Ridge in 1722. Construction started in 1968 and the school was dedicated on September 28, 1969, as William Annin Junior High School and contained grades 6 through 8. The following year it shifted to grades 7 through 9. It became a middle school in 1982. It currently contains grades 6 through 8. The school is one of the few in the United States to have a seismograph.

There are four elementary schools in Basking Ridge.

- Liberty Corner School, was built for a farming community in 1905. It is the oldest school in the district. Part of the original building still remains today. It is located in the Liberty Corner section of Bernards Township.
- Oak Street School was built in 1938, although it was completed late. It was dedicated on November 21, 1939, and opened on November 23, the day before Thanksgiving. Dr. Horatio Gates Whitnall originally owned the property on which Oak Street School was built. The land was used for farming and his home was what is now the Summit Bank. Over the years, the population rose rapidly. It serves downtown Basking Ridge which is the area around the Presbyterian Church and the Old Oak Tree.
- Cedar Hill School was built 1956. It is situated on land which was once the property of a succession of wealthy families: Owen, Lee, Bissell, and Astor. It was donated in the Mid 1950s by the Lees. It serves the area around William Annin Middle School and Ridge High School.
- Mount Prospect was built in 1999. The school was built because a new population rolled in by 2000. Basking Ridge was extended southward and a new subdivision was built: The Hills. Mount Prospect is the newest school in the district and serves the Hills.
- The former Maple Avenue School, a two-story, eight classroom structure, was demolished in the 1970s to make room for the current Basking Ridge Public Library.

Saint James School is a parochial elementary school for students in preschool through eighth grade that operates under the supervision of the Roman Catholic Diocese of Metuchen. In 2024, the school was one of 11 statewide that was recognized as a Blue Ribbon School of Excellence by the United States Department of Education.

== Transportation ==
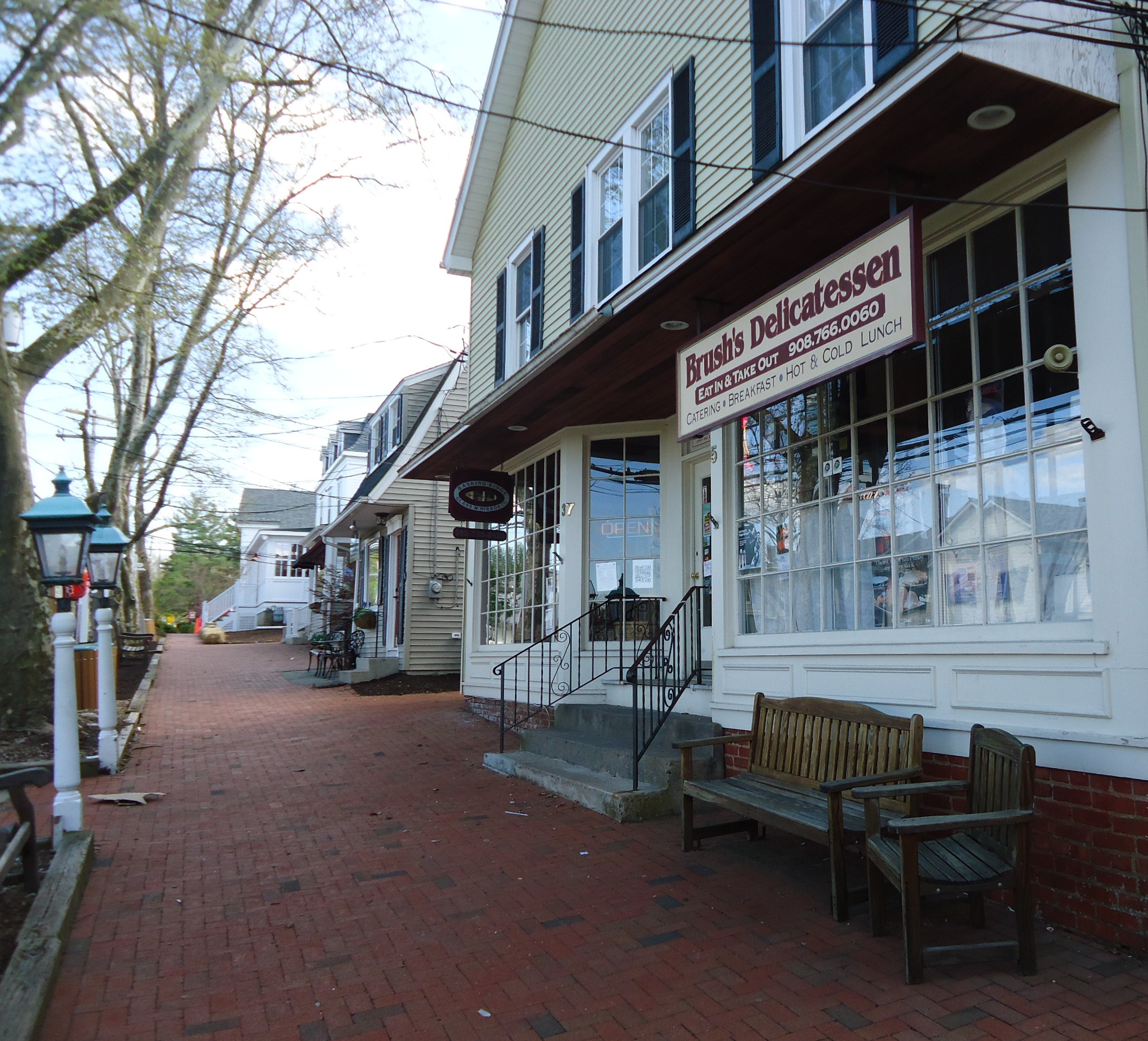
Sidewalk and shops

=== Trains ===
NJ Transit's Gladstone Branch runs through Basking Ridge. There are two stations that residents can use to get to New York City and Hoboken Terminal:

- Basking Ridge: Built in 1912 by the Delaware, Lackawanna and Western Railroad, it serves downtown and north Basking Ridge.
- Lyons: Built in 1931 by the Delaware, Lackawanna and Western Railroad, it serves the Hills, and south Basking Ridge in addition to Liberty Corner. Lyons gets more passengers than Basking Ridge.

=== Buses ===
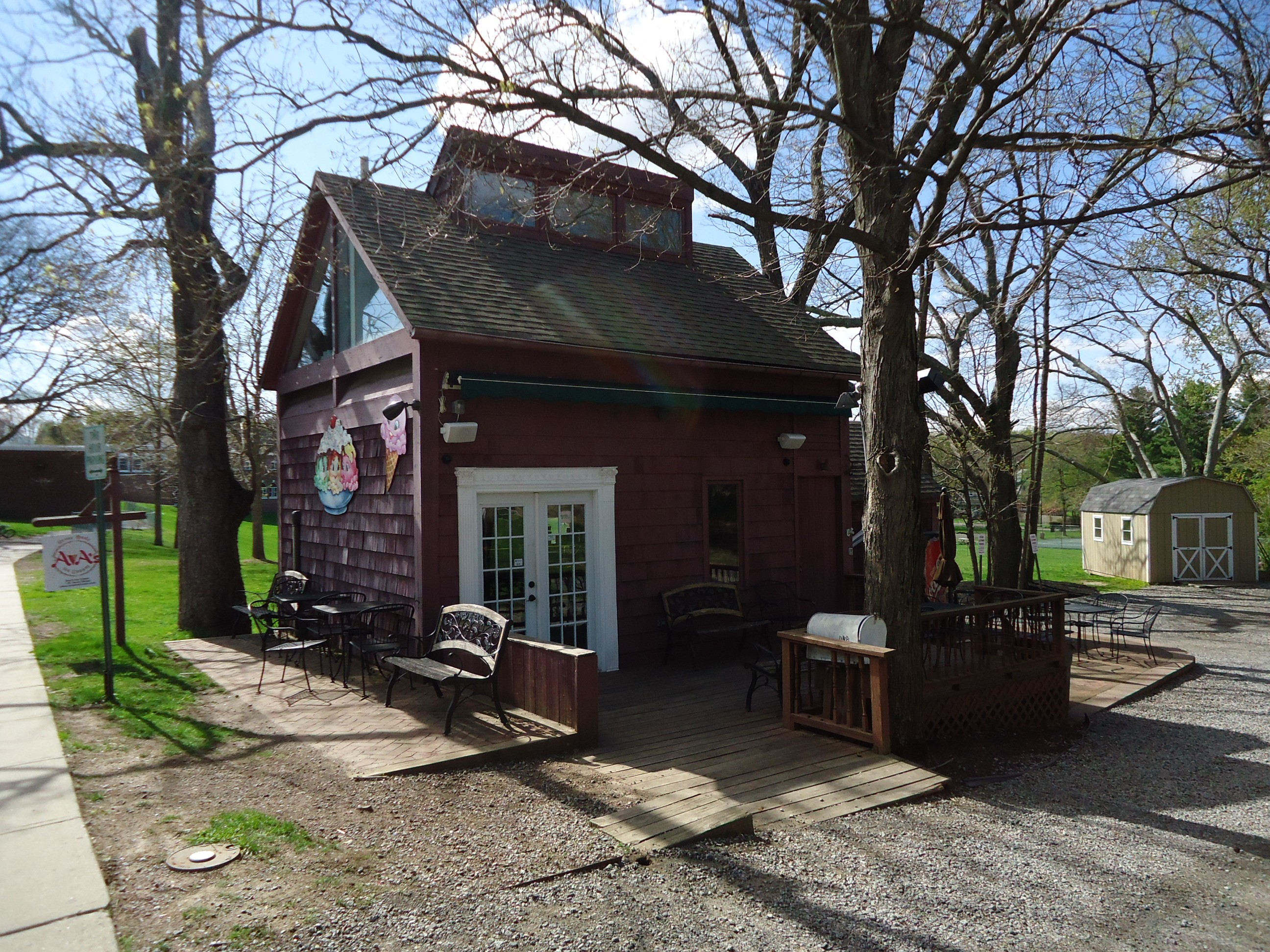
Ice cream shop

Lakeland Bus Lines (Route 78) provides service to and from the Port Authority Bus Terminal in Midtown Manhattan during peak commuting hours.

=== Roads and highways ===
Two Interstates are located near Basking Ridge:

- Interstate 78: Travel west towards Pennsylvania or east towards New York City and Newark
- Interstate 287: Travel north towards upstate New York or south towards Edison.

== Notable people ==
People who were born in, residents of, or otherwise closely associated with Basking Ridge include:

- J. C. Chandor (born 1974), Academy award-nominated writer/director of the 2011 film Margin Call
- Chris Daggett (born 1950), former regional administrator of the United States Environmental Protection Agency and Commissioner of the New Jersey Department of Environmental Protection who ran for Governor of New Jersey in 2009 as an independent
- Marc Del Gaizo (born 1999), professional ice hockey defenseman for the Nashville Predators of the National Hockey League
- Scott Fischer (1955–1996), climber and guide who was the first American to climb Lhotse, the fourth-highest mountain in the world. He died on May 11, 1996, in an attempt to climb Mount Everest in the 1996 Everest Disaster
- Patricia Lee Gauch (born 1934), author of over 30 works of children's literature who was inducted into the New Jersey Literary Hall of Fame in 1993
- Jeff Grace, comedian, screenwriter, film producer, film director and actor, who directed Folk Hero & Funny Guy
- Jon Gutwillig (born 1974), guitarist of the Disco Biscuits
- Tobin Heath (born 1988), 2x World Cup Champion and 2x Olympic gold medalist soccer player with the United States women's national team
- Vincent R. Kramer (1918–2001), United States Marine Corps colonel who was a guerrilla warfare expert and was awarded the Navy Cross during the Korean War
- Peter Kuhn (1955–2009), race car driver who won both the USAC and SCCA Formula Super Vee championships in 1980
- Philip Lindsley (1786–1855), Presbyterian minister, educator and classicist who served as the acting president of the College of New Jersey (now Princeton University) from 1822 to 1824
- Page McConnell (born 1963), keyboardist best known for his work with Phish
- Robert Mulcahy (1932–2022), former athletic director at Rutgers University
- Akshay Nanavati (born 1984), United States Marine Corps veteran, speaker, entrepreneur, ultra runner and author of Fearvana
- Edmund Perry (1825–1878), politician and newspaper publisher, who served as President of the New Jersey Senate from 1861 to 1862
- Jasbir Puar (born 1967), queer theorist, Professor of Women and Gender Studies at Rutgers University and author of The Right to Maim
- Perry Scott (1917–1988), American football player and coach, who played in the NFL for the Detroit Lions
- Helen J. Shen (born 1999/2000), actress and singer, known for her roles on and off-Broadway
- Samuel Lewis Southard (1787–1842), served as U.S. Senator, Secretary of the Navy and as the 10th Governor of New Jersey
- Meryl Streep (born 1949), multiple Oscar-winning actress
- LaDainian Tomlinson (born 1979), former NFL running back who played for the San Diego Chargers and New York Jets
- The founding members of punk rock band The Bouncing Souls grew up in Basking Ridge

== See also ==
- Uplift Humanity India
