= Elias Boudinot =

American politician, Founding Father of the United States (1740-1821)

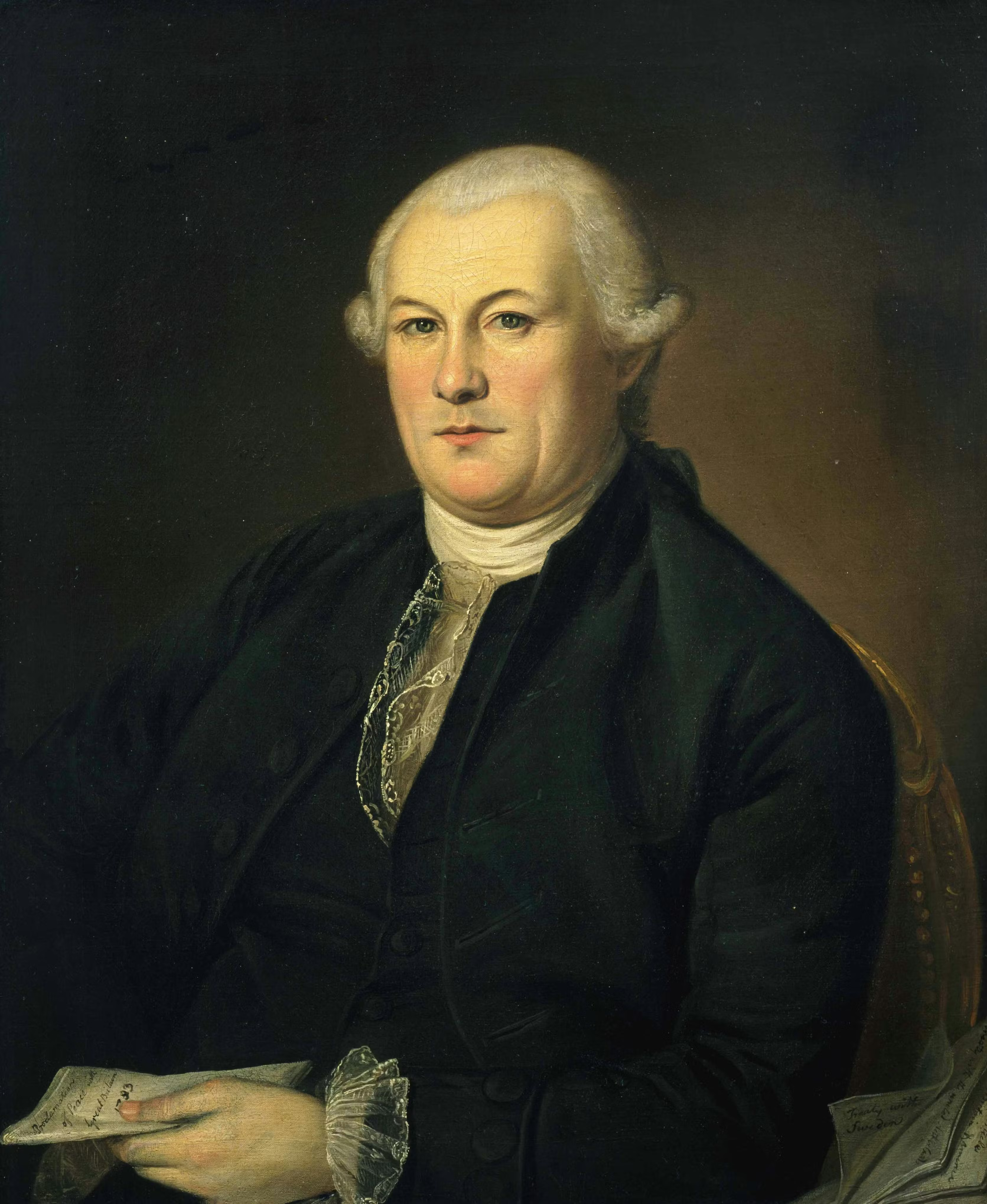
- Portrait by Charles Willson Peale, c. 1784

Director of the United States Mint
- In office October 1795 – July 1805
- President: George Washington; John Adams; Thomas Jefferson
- Preceded by: Henry William de Saussure
- Succeeded by: Robert Patterson

Member of the U.S. House of Representatives from New Jersey's at-large congressional district
- In office March 4, 1789 – March 4, 1795
- Preceded by: none
- Succeeded by: Thomas Henderson

2nd United States Secretary of Foreign Affairs
- In office June 4, 1783 – December 21, 1784
- Appointed by: Congress of the Confederation
- Preceded by: Robert R. Livingston
- Succeeded by: John Jay

4th President of the Confederation Congress
- In office November 4, 1782 – November 2, 1783
- Preceded by: John Hanson
- Succeeded by: Thomas Mifflin

Personal details
- Born: May 2, 1740 Philadelphia, Province of Pennsylvania, British America
- Died: October 24, 1821 (aged 81) Burlington, New Jersey, U.S.
- Resting place: Saint Mary's Episcopal Churchyard, Burlington, New Jersey, U.S.

Elias Boudinot (/ɪˈlaɪəs buːˈdɪnɒt/ il-EYE-əs boo-DIN-ot; May 2, 1740 – October 24, 1821) was an American Founding Father, lawyer, statesman, and early abolitionist and women's rights advocate. During the Revolutionary War, Boudinot was an intelligence officer and prisoner-of-war commissary under general George Washington, working to improve conditions for prisoners on both the American and British sides. In 1779, he was elected to the Continental Congress and then to its successor, the Congress of the Confederation, serving as President of Congress in 1782–1783, the final years of the war.

After being elected to the first, second, and third U.S. Congresses, where he served from 1789 to 1795, Boudinot was appointed director of the United States Mint by president Washington and held the position through 1805 under the presidencies of John Adams and Thomas Jefferson. An advocate for women's rights, he led a Federalist campaign in New Jersey during the early 1790s to encourage women to become active in politics. Boudinot, a devout Presbyterian, spoke out frequently against slavery, both as a member of Congress and as a private citizen. In 1816, he helped found the American Bible Society and served as its first president for five years. Boudinot was also a member of the board of trustees of Princeton College from 1772 to 1821, the year of his death.

== Early life and education ==
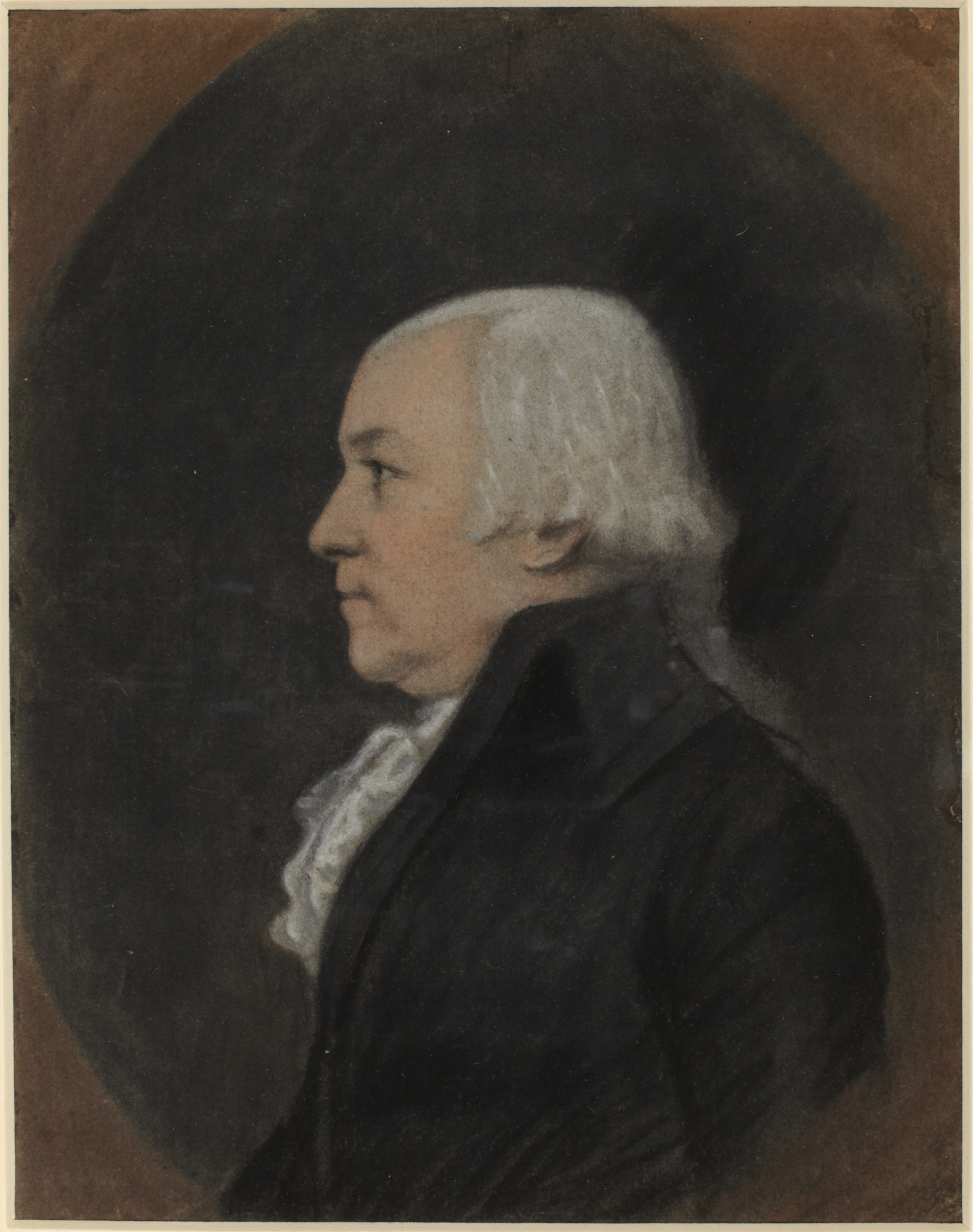
James Sharples, Elias Boudinot IV, Princeton University Art Museum

Elias Boudinot was born in Philadelphia in the Province of Pennsylvania on May 2, 1740. His father, Elias Boudinot III, was a merchant and silversmith; he was a neighbor and friend of Benjamin Franklin. His mother, Mary Catherine Williams, was born in the British West Indies; her father was from Wales. Elias's paternal grandfather, Elie (sometimes called Elias) Boudinot, was the son of Jean Boudinot and Marie Suire of Marans, Aunis, France. They were a Huguenot (French Protestant) family who fled to New York about 1687 to avoid the religious persecutions of King Louis XIV.

Mary Catherine Williams and Elias Boudinot Sr. were married on August 8, 1729. Over the next twenty years, they had nine children. The first, John, was born in the British West Indies-Antigua. Of the others, only the younger Elias and his siblings Annis, Mary, and Elisha reached adulthood. Annis became one of the first published women poets in the Thirteen Colonies, and her work appeared in leading newspapers and magazines. Elisha Boudinot became Chief Justice of the Supreme Court of New Jersey.

After studying and being tutored at home, Elias Boudinot went to Princeton, New Jersey to read the law as a legal apprentice to Richard Stockton, an attorney who married Elias' older sister Annis Boudinot. Stockton would also become a Founding Father as a signatory to the Declaration of Independence in 1776.

== Career ==
In 1760, Boudinot was admitted to the bar and began his practice in Elizabeth, New Jersey. He owned land adjacent to the road from Elizabethtown to Woodbridge Township, New Jersey.

== Marriage and family ==
Coat of Arms of Elias Boudinot

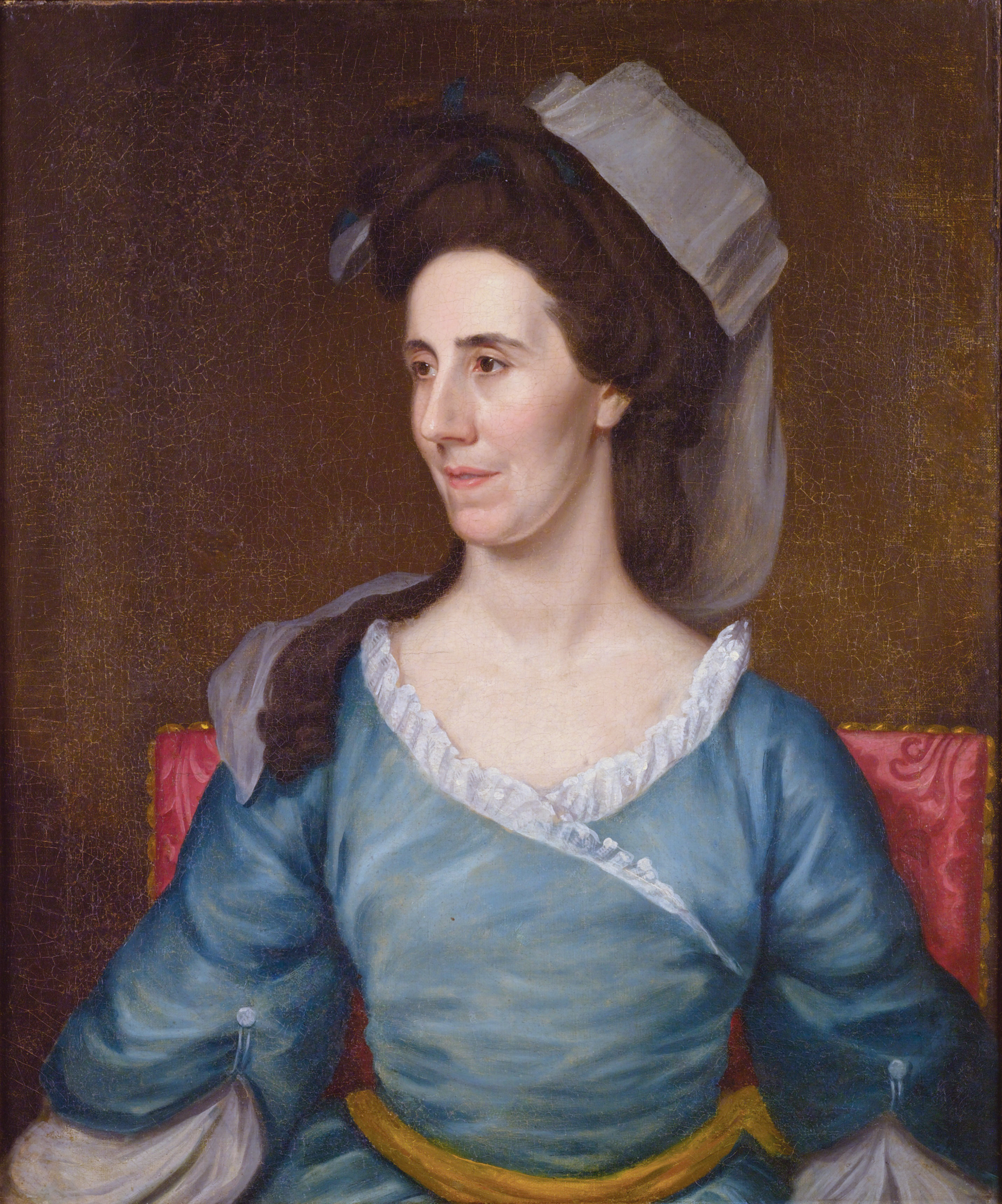
Hannah Stockton Boudinot (1736–1808), by Matthew Pratt

After getting established, on April 21, 1762, Boudinot married Hannah Stockton (1736–1808), Richard's younger sister. They had two children, Maria Boudinot, who died at age two, and Susan Vergereau Boudinot.

Susan married William Bradford, who became Chief Justice of Pennsylvania and Attorney General under George Washington. After her husband's death in 1795, Susan Boudinot Bradford returned to her parents' home to live. The young widow edited her father's papers. Now held by Princeton University, these provide significant insight into the events of the Revolutionary era.

In 1805, Elias, Hannah and Susan moved to a new home in Burlington, New Jersey. Hannah died a few years after their move, and Elias lived there for the remainder of his years.

== Later career ==
In his later years, Boudinot invested and speculated in land. He owned large tracts in Ohio including most of Green Township in what is now the western suburbs of Cincinnati, where there is a street bearing his surname. At his death, he willed 13,000 acres (53 km^{2}) to the city of Philadelphia for parks and city needs. He was buried in the churchyard of St. Mary's Church, Burlington, New Jersey.

== Political career ==
Boudinot became a prominent lawyer and his practice prospered. As the revolution drew near, he aligned with the Whigs, and was elected to the New Jersey provincial assembly in 1775. In the early stages of the Revolutionary War, he was active in promoting enlistment; several times he loaned money to field commanders to purchase supplies. Boudinot helped support the activities of rebel spies.

After the British occupation of New York City, spies were sent to Staten Island and Long Island to observe and report on movements of specific British garrisons and regiments.

On May 5, 1777, General George Washington asked Boudinot to be appointed as commissary general for prisoners. Congress through the board of war concurred. Boudinot was commissioned as a colonel in the Continental Army for this work. He served until July 1778, when competing responsibilities forced him to resign. The commissary managed enemy prisoners, and also was responsible for supplying American prisoners who were held by the British.

In November 1777, the New Jersey legislature named Boudinot as one of their delegates to the Second Continental Congress. His duties as Commissary prevented his attendance, so in May 1778 he resigned. By early July he had been replaced and attended his first meeting of the Congress on July 7, 1778. As a delegate, he still continued his concerns for the welfare of prisoners of war. His first term ended that year.

In 1781, Boudinot returned to the Congress, for a term lasting through 1783. In November 1782, he was elected as President of the Continental Congress for a one-year term. The President of Congress was a mostly ceremonial position with no real authority, but the office did require him to handle a good deal of correspondence and sign official documents. On April 15, 1783, he signed the Preliminary Articles of Peace. He also served as Secretary of Foreign affairs from June 1783 to December 1784. When the United States government was formed in 1789, Boudinot was elected from New Jersey to the US House of Representatives; he was also an unsuccessful candidate for the U.S. Senate that year. He was elected to the second and third congresses as well, where he generally supported the administration. He refused to join the expansion of affiliated groups that formed formal political parties. He was one of nine representatives to vote against the Eleventh Amendment to the United States Constitution.

In 1794, he declined to serve another term, and left Congress in early 1795. In October 1795, President George Washington appointed him as Director of the United States Mint, a position he held through succeeding administrations until he retired in 1805.

== Later public service ==
Portrait of Boudinot by John Vanderlyn, c. 1821

In addition to serving in political office, Elias supported many civic, religious, and educational causes during his life. Boudinot served as one of the trustees of the College of New Jersey (later Princeton University) for nearly half a century, from 1772 until 1821. When the Continental Congress was forced to leave Philadelphia in 1783 while he was president, he moved the meetings to Princeton, where they met in the college's Nassau Hall.

On September 24, 1789, the House of Representatives voted to recommend the First Amendment of the newly drafted Constitution to the states for ratification. The next day, Congressman Boudinot proposed that the House and Senate jointly request of President Washington to proclaim a day of thanksgiving for "the many signal favors of Almighty God." Boudinot said that he

could not think of letting the session pass over without offering an opportunity to all the citizens of the United States of joining, with one voice, in returning to Almighty God their sincere thanks for the many blessings he had poured down upon them.

Boudinot was elected a member of the American Antiquarian Society in 1814.

A devout Presbyterian, Boudinot supported missions and missionary work. He wrote The Age of Revelation in response to Thomas Paine's The Age of Reason. He was one of the founders of the American Bible Society, and after 1816 served as its president.

He argued for the rights of black and American Indian citizens, and sponsored students to the Board School for Indians in Connecticut. One of these, a young Cherokee named Gallegina Uwatie, also known as Buck Watie, stayed with him in Burlington on his way to the school. The two so impressed each other that Gallegina asked for and was given permission to adopt the statesman's name. Later known as Elias Boudinot, he was an editor of the Cherokee Phoenix, the nation's first newspaper, which was published in Cherokee and English.

== Legacy and honors ==
- Princeton University Library holds the Boudinot-Stockton papers, as well as many family possessions and portraits.
- Elias Boudinot Elementary School in Burlington, New Jersey is named after him, as are the following:
- Boudinot Street in Philadelphia, located between C and D Streets.
- Boudinot Avenue in Western Hills, Cincinnati, Ohio home of the original LaRosa's pizzeria.
- Boudinot Place in Elizabeth, New Jersey
- Boudinot Street in Princeton, New Jersey.
- Boudinot Lane in Franklin Township, New Jersey
- Boudinot–Southard Farmstead in Bernards Township, New Jersey

== Quotes ==
- "For nearly half a century have I anxiously and critically studied that invaluable treasure [the Bible]; and I still scarcely ever take it up that I do not find something new – that I do not receive some valuable addition to my stock of knowledge or perceive some instructive fact never observed before. In short, were you to ask me to recommend the most valuable book in the world, I should fix on the Bible as the most instructive both to the wise and ignorant. Were you to ask me for one affording the most rational and pleasing entertainment to the inquiring mind, I should repeat, it is the Bible; and should you renew the inquiry for the best philosophy or the most interesting history, I should still urge you to look into your Bible. I would make it, in short, the Alpha and Omega of knowledge; and be assured, that it is for want of understanding the scriptures, both of the Old and New Testament, that so little value is set upon them by the world at large."

== Archival collections ==
The Presbyterian Historical Society in Philadelphia has a collection of incoming correspondence and several legal agreements pertaining to land ownership related to Boudinot from 1777 to 1821 in its holdings. The correspondence dating from 1777 to 1778 almost exclusively deals with the trading and releasing of prisoners.

Political offices
Preceded by John Hanson	President of the Continental Congress; November 4, 1782 – November 2, 1783	Succeeded by Thomas Mifflin
U.S. House of Representatives
Preceded by District created	Member of the U.S. House of Representatives from New Jersey's at-large congressional district March 4, 1789 – March 3, 1797	Succeeded by Thomas Henderson
Government offices
Preceded by Henry William de Saussure	3rd Director of the United States Mint; 1795–1805	Succeeded by Robert Patterson
