= Robert Sims =

Robert Sims may refer to:

- Robert Sims (baritone) (born 1980), American lyric baritone who specializes in African American folk songs and spirituals
- Robert Page Sims (1872–1944), African American academic, civil rights leader, and college president
- J. Robert Sims (born c. 1941), American chemical and mechanical engineer
- Rob Sims (born 1983), American football guard
- Bob Sims (basketball, born 1938) (1938–2006), American basketball player for the NBA's Los Angeles Lakers and St. Louis Hawks
- Bob Sims (basketball, born 1915) (1915–1994), American basketball player for the NBL's Tri-Cities Blackhawks and Sheboygan Redskins
- Robbie Sims (born 1959), American boxer

== See also ==
- Robert Simms (disambiguation)
- Sir Robert Syms (born 1956), British politician
