= Franklin Corners, New Jersey =

Populated place in Somerset County, New Jersey, US

- Unincorporated community
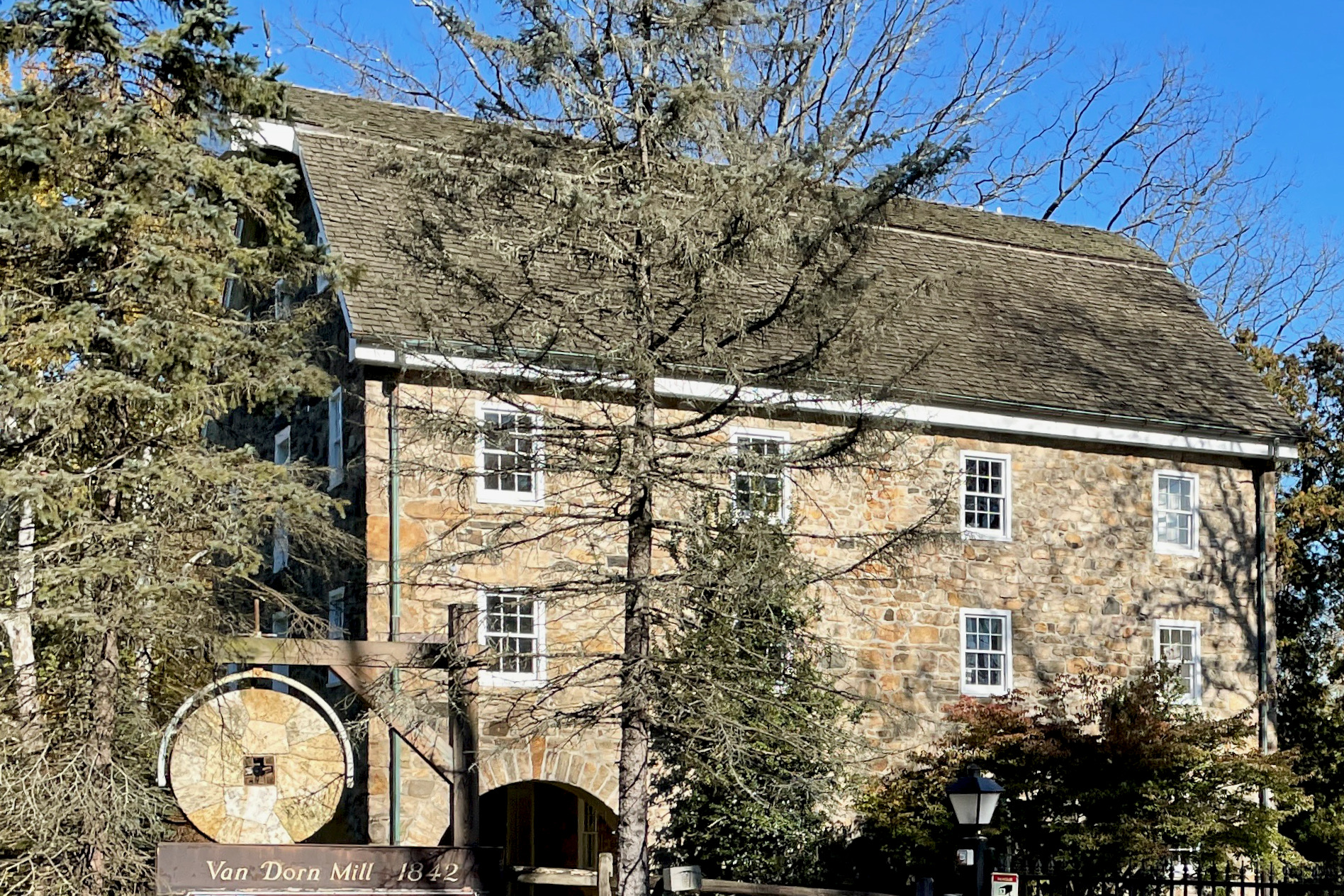
- Van Dorn's Mill

- Location within Somerset County, New Jersey Location within New Jersey Location within the United States
- Coordinates: 40°43′56″N 74°32′30″W
- Country: United States
- State: New Jersey
- County: Somerset
- Township: Bernards

Franklin Corners is an unincorporated community located along the Passaic River at the intersection of County Route 613 (Childs Road) and U.S. Route 202 (Morristown Road) in Bernards Township of Somerset County, New Jersey. In the 19th century, it had a grist mill, saw mill, general store, school, and several houses. The Franklin Corners Historic District, featuring Van Dorn's Mill, was listed on the National Register of Historic Places in 1975.

== History ==
In 1768, Samuel Lewis built a wooden grain mill here on the Passaic River. During the American Revolutionary War, it provided grain to the Continental Army during the 1779–1780 winter encampment at nearby Jockey Hollow. In 1842, Ferdinand Van Dorn bought the property and built a new, three and one-half story stone mill, now known as Van Dorn's Mill. In 1929, local resident and prominent restaurateur William Childs bought the mill property and moved the barn to the other side of U.S. 202. He restored it and established an inn, now known as the Grain House Restaurant at the Olde Mill Inn.

The Franklin Academy was a small private school for the community. The two-story schoolhouse on Childs Road was built in 1832 with Greek Revival style.

== Historic district ==
- Franklin Corners Historic District
- U.S. National Register of Historic Places
- U.S. Historic district
- New Jersey Register of Historic Places
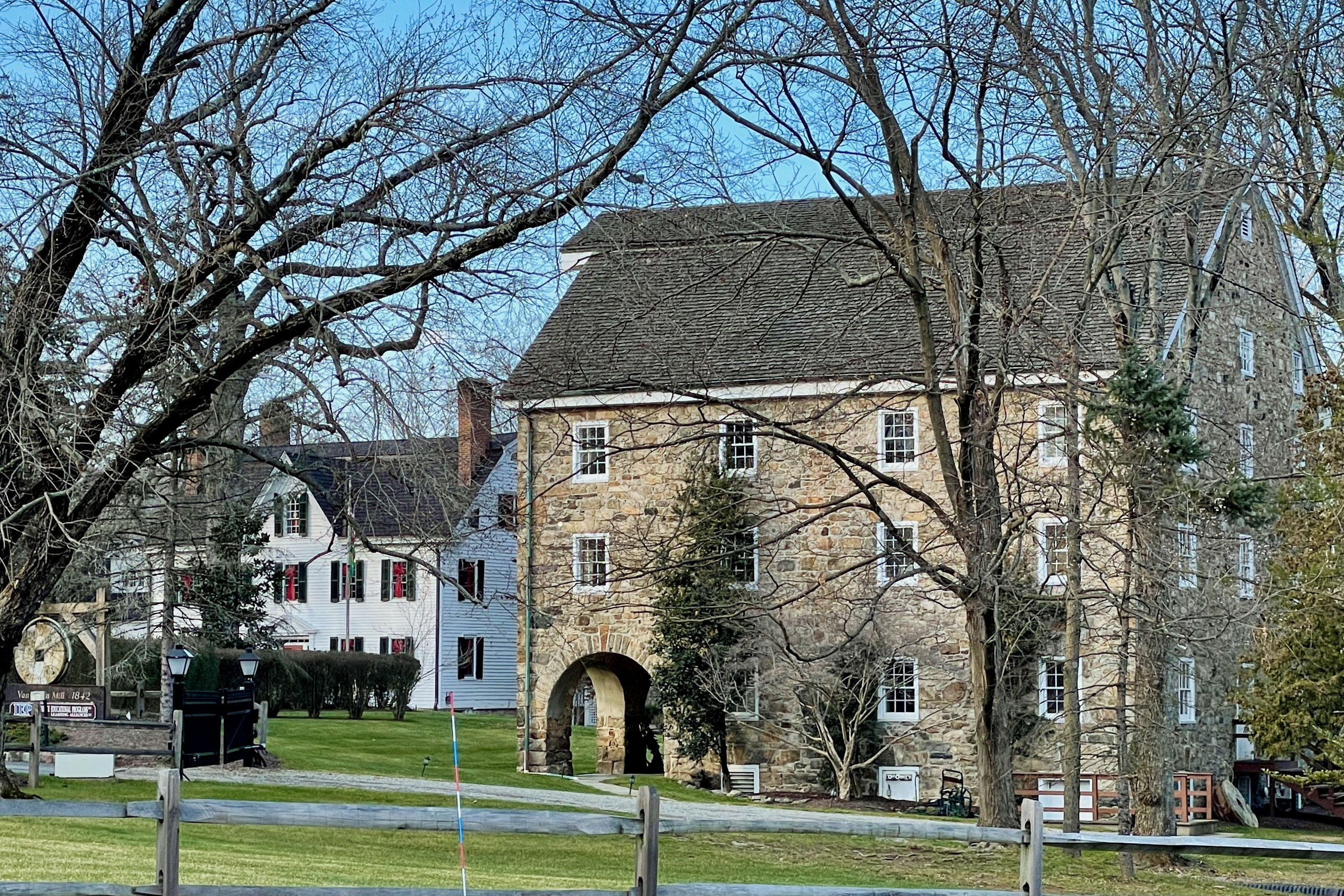
- Ferdinand Van Dorn House and Mill
- Location: Hardscrabble and Childs roads
- Area: 47 acres (19 ha)
- Architectural style: Greek Revival
- NRHP reference No.: 75001159
- NJRHP No.: 2427

Significant dates
- Added to NRHP: May 12, 1975
- Designated NJRHP: December 12, 1974

The Franklin Corners Historic District is a 47-acre (19 ha) historic district encompassing the community along Hardscrabble and Childs roads in Bernards Township. It was added to the National Register of Historic Places on May 12, 1975 for its significance in architecture, commerce, education and industry. The district includes 11 contributing buildings.

In 1935, Van Dorn's Mill, then owned by William Childs, was documented by the Historic American Buildings Survey. McMurtry's Saw Mill, built in 1850, was documented by HABS in 1939.

The Ferdinand Van Dorn House, next to the mill, is a two and one-half story house built with Greek Revival style. The oldest house in the district, the Samuel Johnson House, was built c. 1770. The oldest section of the Joab Johnson House was built c. 1805. It was later William Gordon's General Store c. 1832–1850.

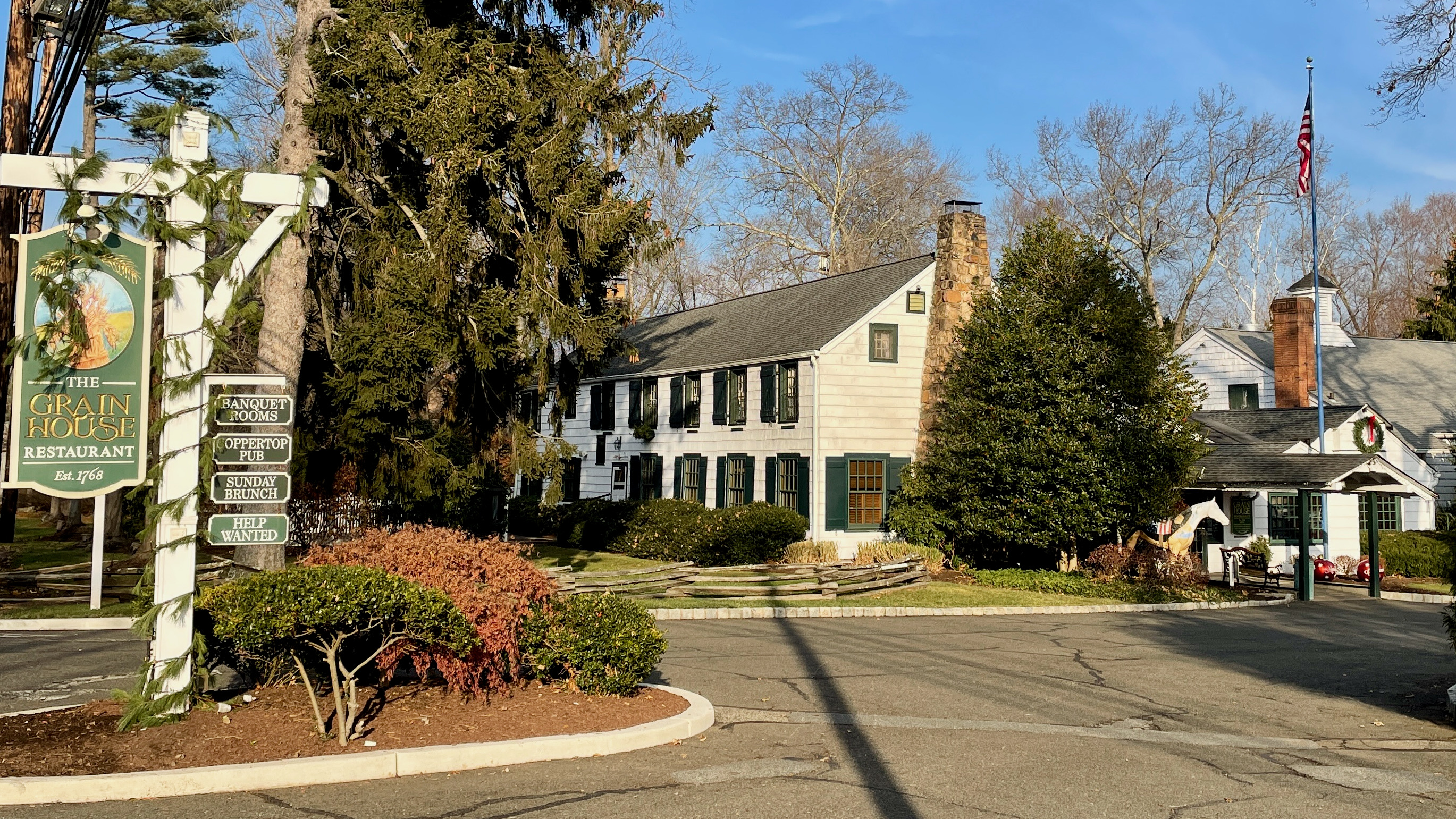
Grain House Restaurant

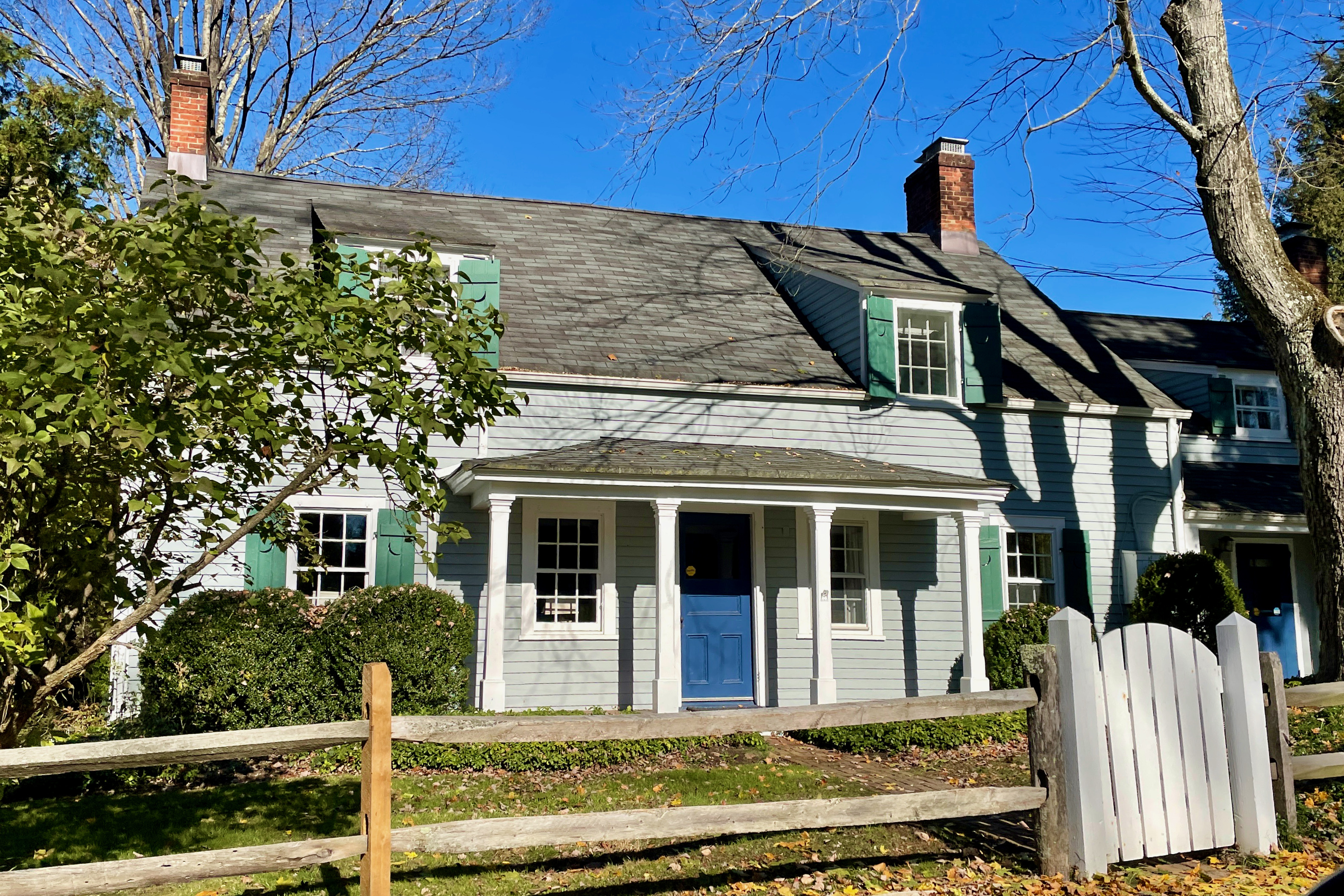
Samuel Johnson House

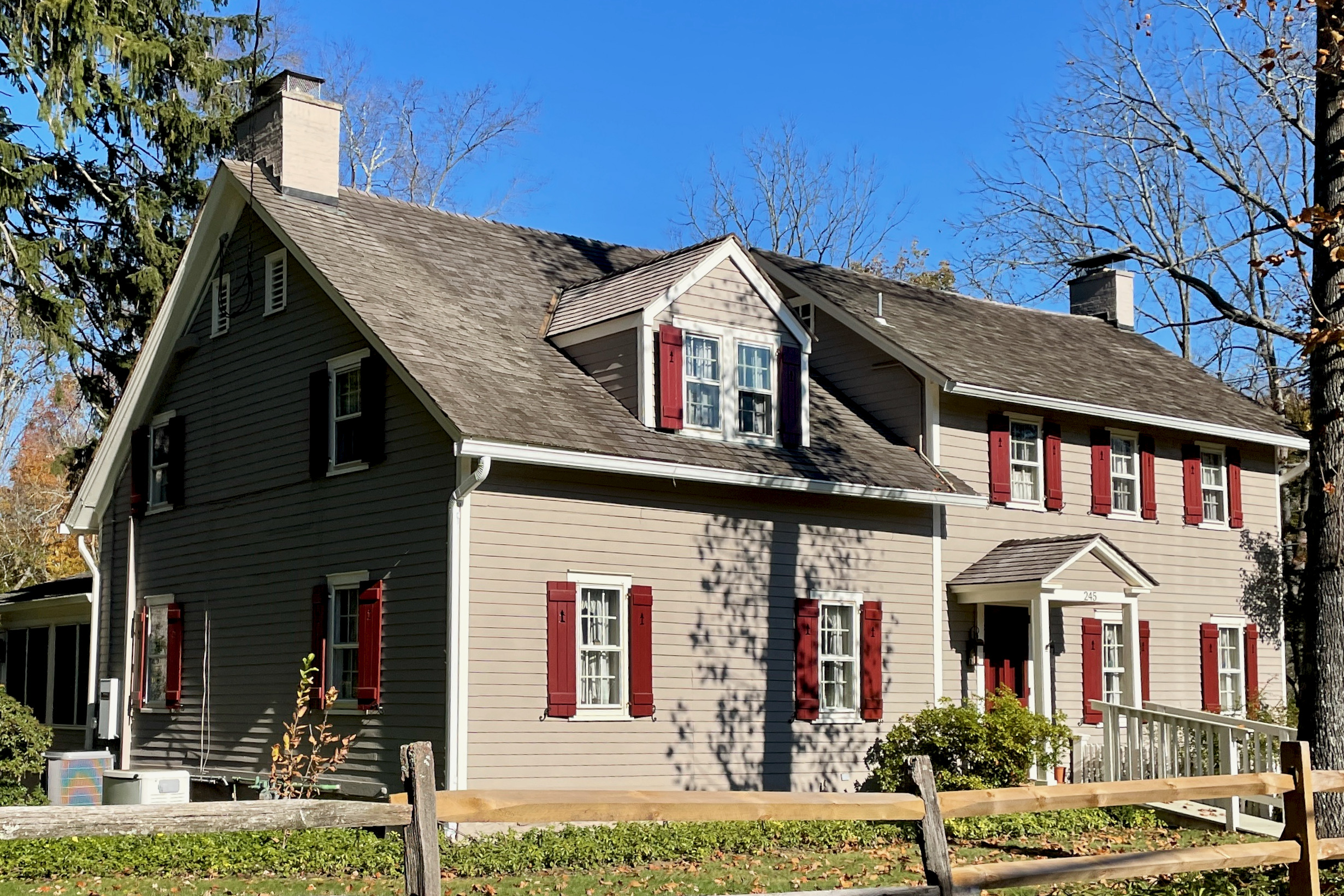
Joab Johnson House / William Gordon's General Store

== Transportation ==
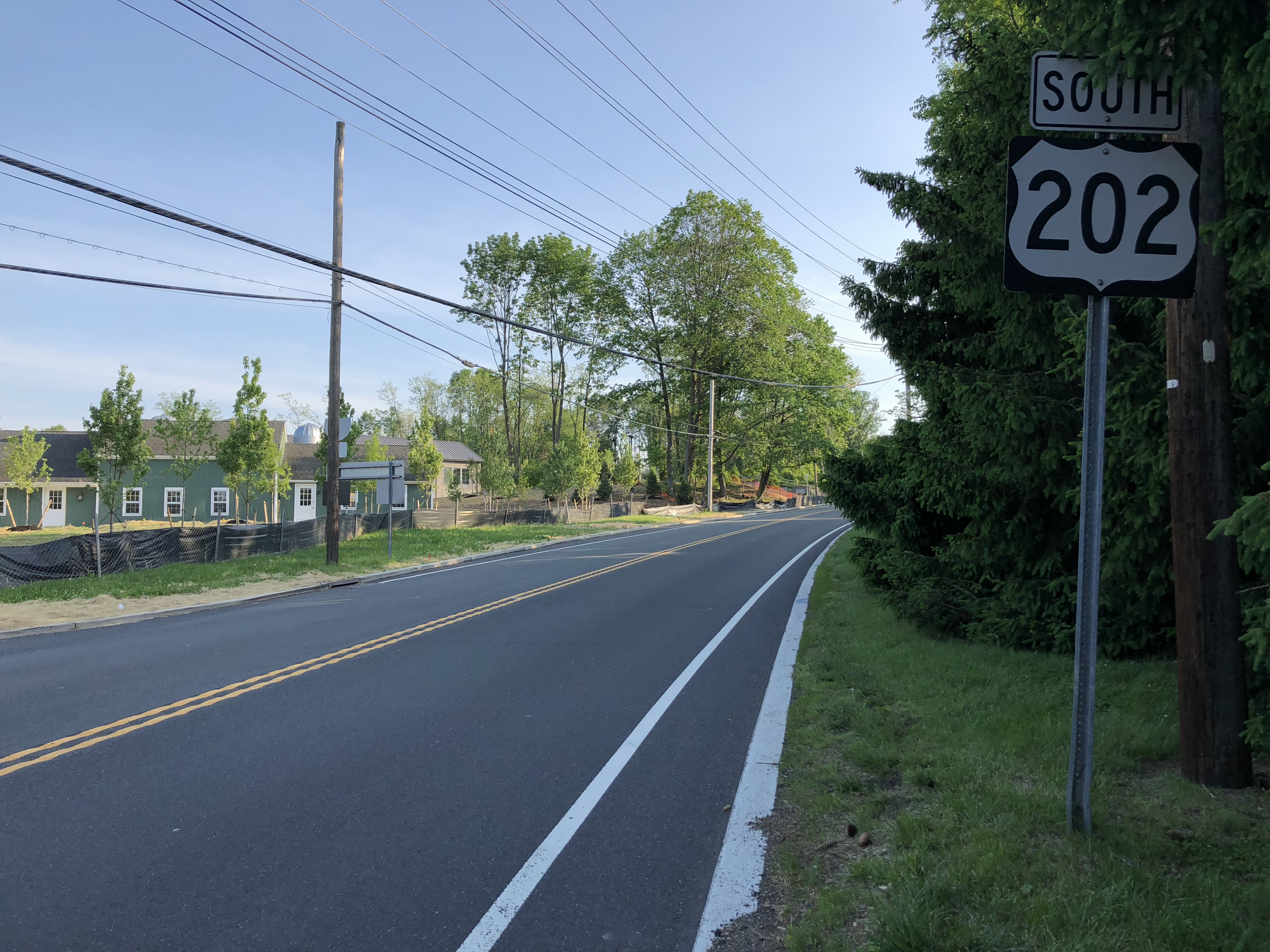
Southbound U.S. Route 202 (Morristown Road) at Somerset County Route 613 (Childs Road)

There are several main roads in the community. U.S. Route 202, running south from Morristown and northeast from Bernardsville, intersects with County Route 613 (Childs Road) and North Maple Avenue, running north from Basking Ridge.

Childs Road is named after William Childs and his brother Samuel. Van Dorn Road is named after Ferdinand Van Dorn.

== See also ==
- National Register of Historic Places listings in Somerset County, New Jersey
- New Jersey Brigade Encampment Site – Additional 1779–1780 winter encampment site
- List of the oldest buildings in New Jersey
