= Robert Simms =

Robert or Bob Simms may refer to:

- Robert D. Simms (1926–2008), Justice of the Oklahoma Supreme Court
- Robert Simms (politician) (born 1984), Australian politician, usually referred to as Rob Simms
- Robert Simms (United Irishmen) (1761–1843), Irish radical
- Robert Simms (the younger) (before 1821–after 1843), son of the Irish radical, one of the founders of the Belfast Natural History Society
- Bob Simms (born 1938), American football player

== See also ==
- Robert Sims (disambiguation)
- Sir Robert Syms (born 1956), British politician
- Robert Symms (1931–2014), American photographer
