= Kennedy–Martin–Stelle Farmstead =

- U.S. National Register of Historic Places
- U.S. Historic district
- New Jersey Register of Historic Places
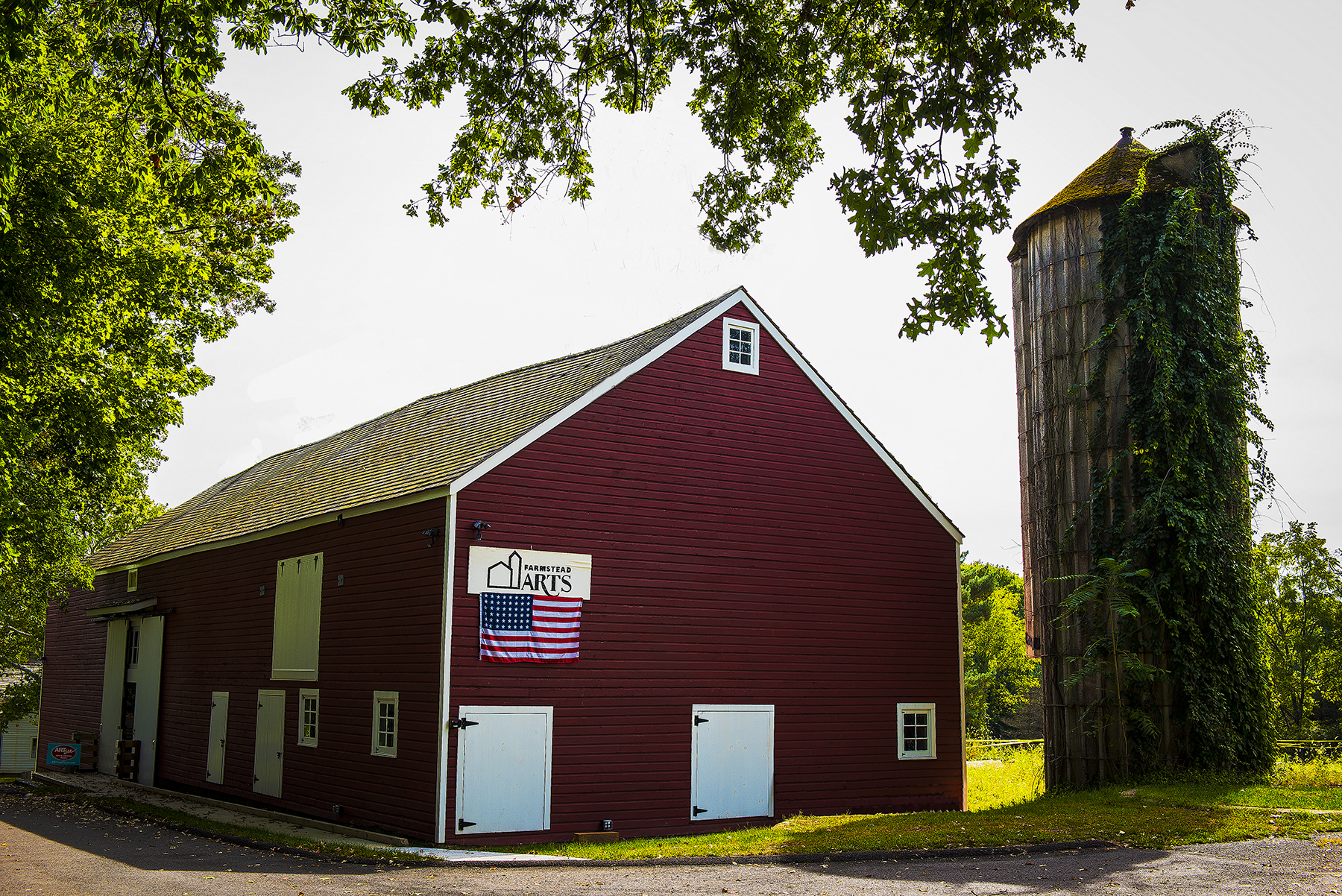
- English barn

- Location within Somerset County, New Jersey Location within New Jersey Location within the United States
- Location: 450 King George Road, Bernards Township, New Jersey
- Coordinates: 40°39′29″N 74°31′44″W
- Area: 4.4 acres (1.8 ha)
- Architectural style: Colonial
- NRHP reference No.: 03000868
- NJRHP No.: 4200

Significant dates
- Added to NRHP: May 5, 2004
- Designated NJRHP: June 9, 2003

The Kennedy–Martin–Stelle Farmstead is located at 450 King George Road in Bernards Township of Somerset County, New Jersey. The 4.4-acre (1.8 ha) farmstead was added to the National Register of Historic Places on May 5, 2004 for its significance in architecture, education and politics/government from 1762 to 1852. The farmstead includes four contributing buildings and two contributing structures. It is now the home of the Farmstead Arts Center.

== History ==
In 1762, Reverend Samuel Kennedy of the Presbyterian Church in Basking Ridge purchased the farm from Moses Doty. He advertised a sale of the property for June 17, 1767, and by the late 1770s, Colonel Ephraim Martin became the owner. Martin was an American Revolutionary War soldier and New Jersey legislator. He sold the farm c. 1794 to Oliver and Samuel Stelle, stepsons of his wife, née Catherine Stelle. Oliver Stelle became the sole owner and remained here until his death in 1832, with his son Clarkson Stelle inheriting it.

== Description ==
The farmhouse is a 1 1/2-story frame building with a gable roof. The oldest part was built in the 18th century with Dutch Colonial style. The English barn was built in two parts, an 18th-century large frame barn and an extension added c. 1840.

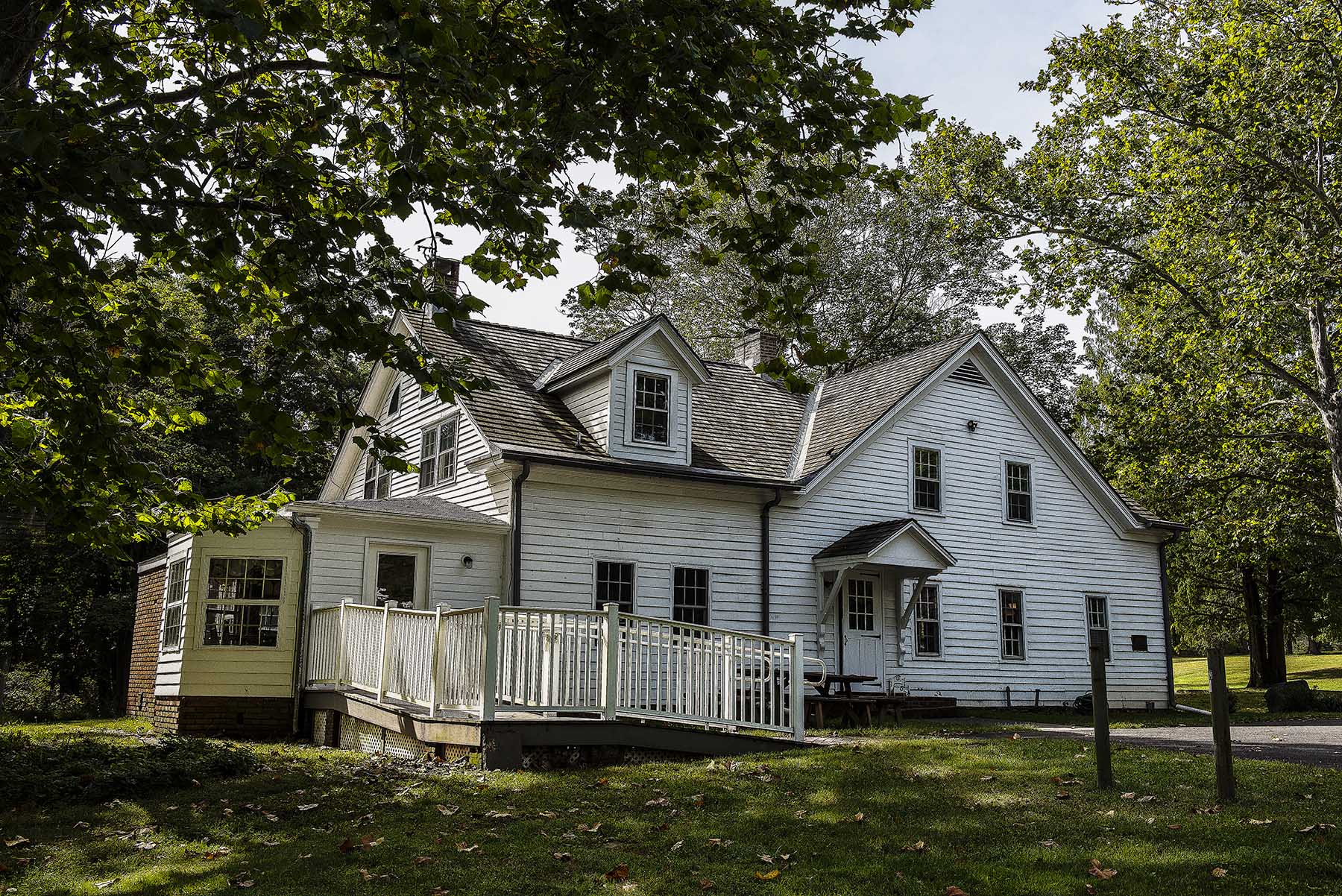
Farmhouse

== See also ==
- National Register of Historic Places listings in Somerset County, New Jersey
