= Samuel S. Childs =

American judge (1863-1925)

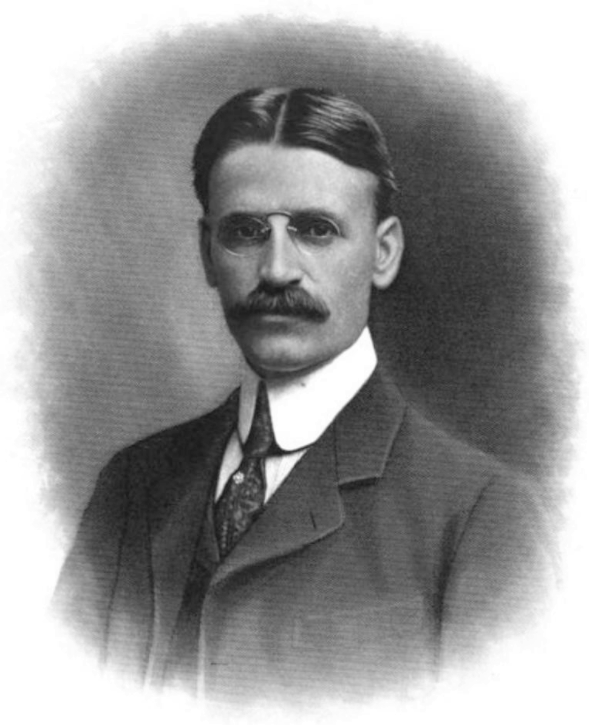

Member of the New Jersey Senate from Somerset County
- In office 1902–1905
- Preceded by: Joseph S. Frelinghuysen Sr.
- Succeeded by: Joseph S. Frelinghuysen Sr.

Personal details
- Born: April 4, 1863 Basking Ridge, New Jersey
- Died: March 17, 1925 (aged 61) New York City
- Party: Democratic
- Spouse: Emma Frances Alward

Samuel Shannon Childs (April 4, 1863 – September 3, 1961) was an American restaurateur and Democratic Party politician from New Jersey. Childs was founder and president of the Childs Company, one of the first restaurant chains in the United States and Canada. He represented Somerset County in the New Jersey Senate from 1902 to 1905.

== Early life and education ==
Samuel Shannon Childs was born on April 4, 1863 in Basking Ridge, New Jersey, to William and Elizabeth (née Kline) Childs. His father was a farmer who had ten children, including his brothers William Jr., Luther, Ellsworth, and Frederick, and his sisters Lucy, Harriet, and Florence. As a child, Samuel worked on the family farm.

He was educated at the Franklin Institute in Bernards Township and Morristown High School. Although he was appointed by Benjamin F. Howey as a cadet at the United States Military Academy, he attended for only one year.

== Business career ==
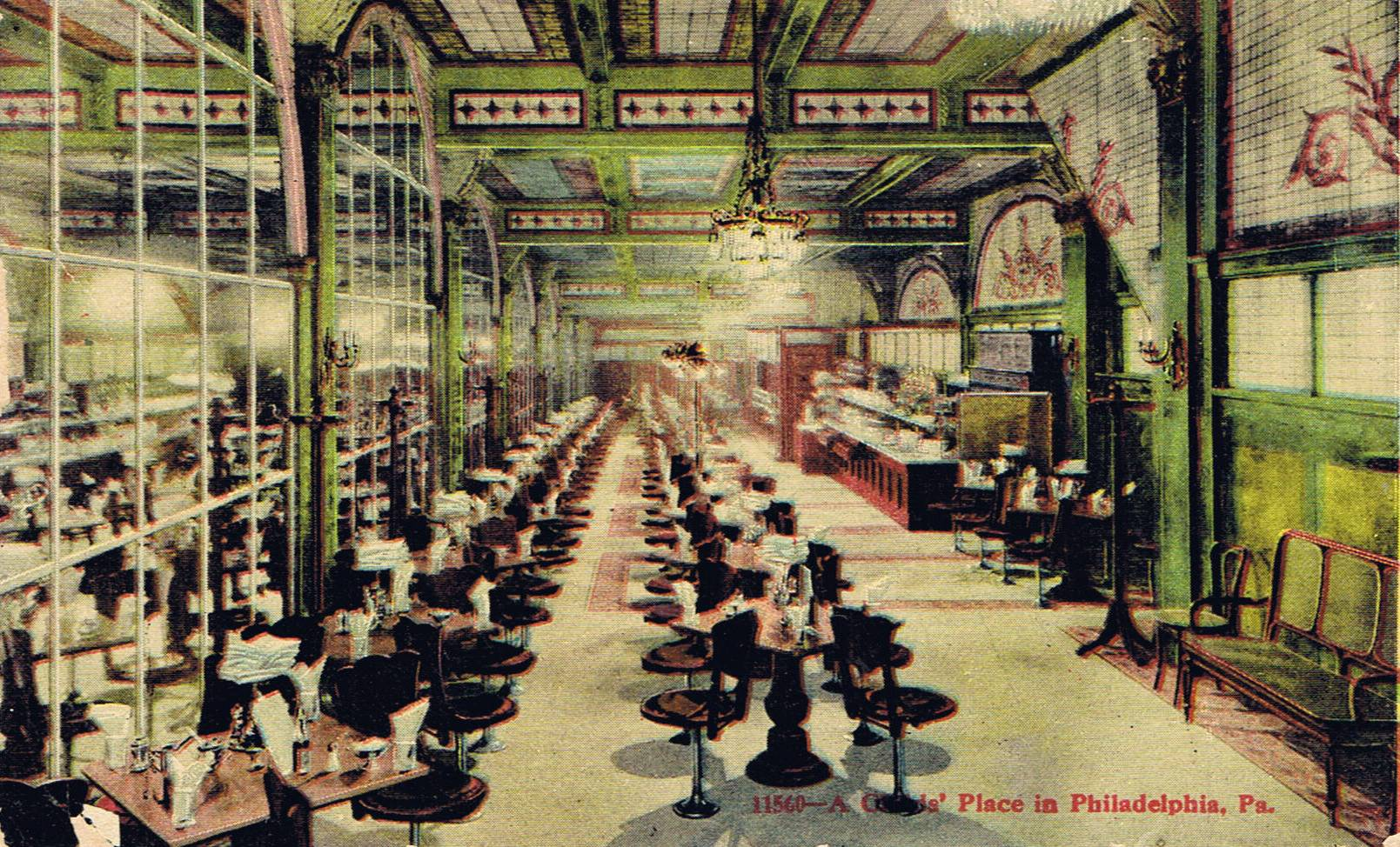
Postcard depicting a Childs' location in Philadelphia c. 1908

=== Childs' Restaurants ===
After two years working as a civil engineer for bridges and railroads in upstate New York, Long Island, and the Dakotas, Childs quit engineering to work for A. W. Dennett, who operated restaurants in New York, Brooklyn, and Philadelphia. He was trained as a manager and succeeded in getting his brother William Jr. hired, but they were both fired within six months.

Upon leaving their jobs in 1889, Samuel and William Jr. pooled $1,500 in savings and secured $100 in loans to start a restaurant in a vacant store in the Merchant's Hotel at 41 Cortlandt Street in Manhattan, where they used second-hand furniture and did the carpentry themselves. To maximize profits, the restaurant emphasized affordable and quick meals for the working class, with an unusual emphasis for its time on cleanliness and hygiene. Their novel design featured white tiles and white uniforms, as well as pancake griddles in the front window for passers-by to watch. The brothers were among the first American restaurateurs to predominantly hire women as servers.

They expanded to a second restaurant on Fulton Street within a few months. Within five years, they had expanded to five locations. At their Broadway location, they innovated the use of the cafeteria format, in which customers formed a line to self-serve dishes and on a carry-away tray. In 1898, they combined with several investors, including Henry Morgan Tilford and Charles Sweeney of Standard Oil, to incorporate Childs Unique Dairy Company at a value of $1,000,000 (approximately $32,000,000 in 2024) and expand outside of New York City. Samuel served as president and William served as vice president.

In 1906, a third brother, Ellsworth, joined the company when Samuel and William Jr. acquired fifteen of his restaurants. Thereafter, Ellsworth remained an executive with the company until his death in 1929, and he was a driving force behind the physical expansion of the business to several new locations.

By the time of his death, the company operated 107 restaurants in 29 cities throughout the United States and Canada, serving 50 million meals every year and reporting annual profits of $2,000,000 (approximately $28,000,000 in 2024). The Magazine of Wall Street referred to Childs as "a national institution" and noted that "millions of people eat there at least once in a while and some eat much more often."

=== Other business interests ===
In addition to his work founding and operating the restaurant chain, Childs was president and director of two affiliated companies, the Childs Dining Hall Company and Childs Real Estate Company. He was also a director of Chatham Phenix Bank and Trust, a founder and director of the Bernardsville National Bank, and president of the Bernards Water Company, in which role he developed the water and electric lighting system of Bernardsville and assisted in the electric lighting system for Morristown.

== Political career ==
Childs was involved in local Bernards Township politics. From 1900 to 1903, he served as president of the local board of education.

In 1901, he was nominated by the Democratic Party for New Jersey Senate. Although the county was traditionally Republican, Childs narrowly defeated incumbent Joseph S. Frelinghuysen by 312 votes to win the seat, serving from 1902 to 1905. In a 1904 rematch with Frelinghuysen, he was defeated handily. He was the last Democratic senator to represent any part of Somerset for over a century until the election of Andrew Zwicker in 2021.

== Personal life and death ==
Childs married Emma Frances Alward in Basking Ridge on January 30, 1890. Their daughter, Mary Childs, was born February 12, 1896. A second daughter, Lois A. Childs, was born on January 26, 1900.

He was a member of Congressional Country Club, Somerset Hills Country Club, Spring Valley Country Club, and Morris County Country Club. In addition, he was a trustee of the Kent Place School and an elder of the Basking Ridge Presbyterian Church.

Childs died on March 17, 1925 from a hemorrhage during surgery to repair an ulcer of the duodenum.

Childs Road in Bernardsville, New Jersey where most of the family lived, was named for them.
