= Boudinot–Southard Farmstead =

- U.S. National Register of Historic Places
- New Jersey Register of Historic Places
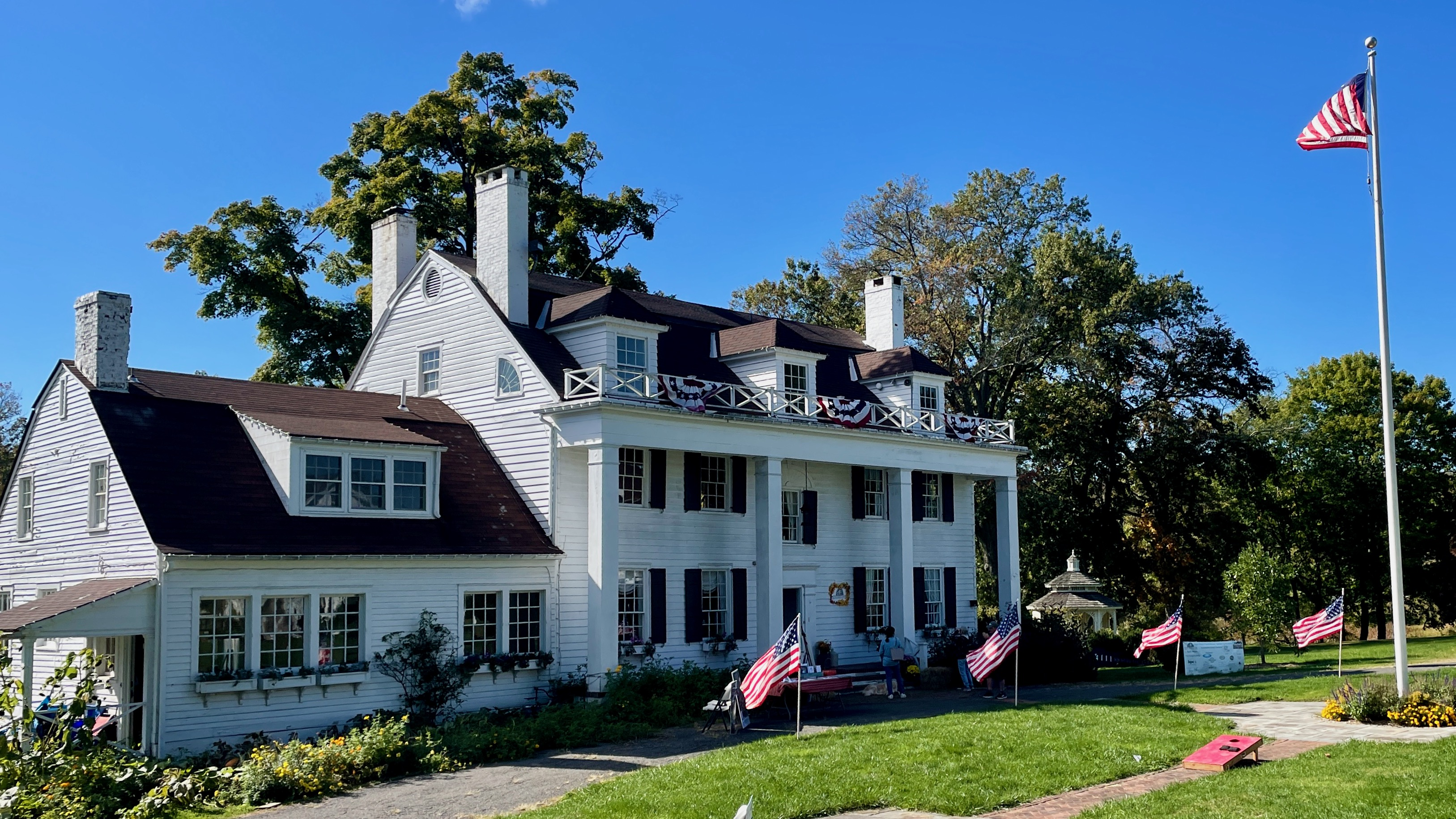
- Colonial Revival Farmhouse

- Location within Somerset County, New Jersey Location within New Jersey Location within the United States
- Location: 135 North Maple Avenue; Bernards Township, New Jersey
- Coordinates: 40°42′55″N 74°32′32″W
- Area: 37 acres (15 ha)
- Architectural style: Colonial Revival
- NRHP reference No.: 09001101
- NJRHP No.: 4955

Significant dates
- Added to NRHP: December 18, 2009
- Designated NJRHP: September 11, 2009

The Boudinot–Southard Farmstead is located at 135 North Maple Avenue in Bernards Township of Somerset County, New Jersey. The property was purchased by Elias Boudinot in 1771. Featuring a Colonial Revival farmhouse, it was added to the National Register of Historic Places on December 18, 2009, for its significance in agriculture, architecture, military and politics/government. The 37-acre (15 ha) farmstead includes four contributing buildings and two contributing structures. It is also known as the Ross Farm.

== History ==
In 1771, Edward Lewis sold the property to Elias Boudinot IV (1740–1821), a lawyer from Elizabeth, who then lived at Boxwood Hall. He and his family relocated here in November 1776 and stayed until November 1783. During the American Revolutionary War, Boudinot was the president of the Continental Congress from 1782 to 1783, and after the war was a United States representative from New Jersey, 1789–1795. In 1785, he sold the property to Henry Southard (1747–1842), who was United States representative from New Jersey, 1801–1811 and 1815–1821. In 1818, Southard sold the property to George Slater of New York City. In 1952, after several property transfers, Nathaniel E. Burgess sold it to Edmund B. Ross. In 2005, the property was sold to the county for recreation, conservation, and historic preservation purposes.

== Description ==
The farmhouse is a two and one-half story building featuring Colonial Revival style. The bank barn is mid 19th century. The carriage house is likely the same age as the barn. The lower level has a three-stall horse stable and the second floor has been converted to an apartment.

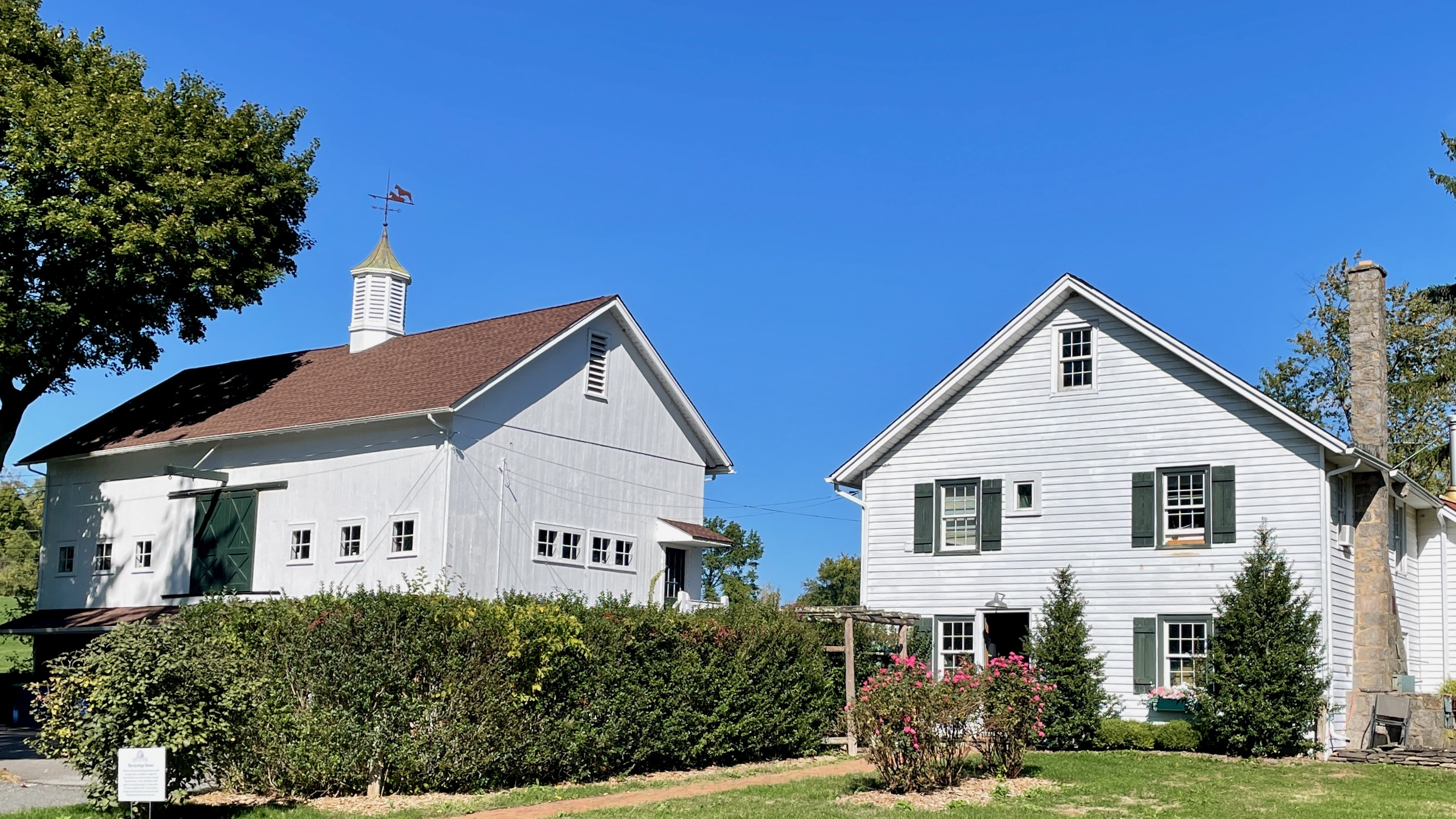
Barn and carriage house

== See also ==
- National Register of Historic Places listings in Somerset County, New Jersey
- List of the oldest buildings in New Jersey
