= J. Robert Sims =

American engineer

J. Robert Sims (born c. 1941) is an American chemical and mechanical engineer, former research engineer at ExxonMobil, and inventor, who served as president of the American Society of Mechanical Engineers for the year 2014–15.

Sims is known as "authority in risk-based technologies, high pressure equipment, mechanical integrity evaluation and Fitness-For-Service analysis, including brittle fracture analysis."

== Biography ==
Born in the Basking Ridge section of Bernards Township, New Jersey, Sims obtained his BSc in engineering in 1963, from the Vanderbilt University School of Engineering.

After his graduation, Sims joined Exxon chemical company, now ExxonMobil, where he served for over 30 years. He eventually specialized in pressure equipment at the Exxon Research and Engineering Company in Florham Park, New Jersey. He participated in the worldwide standardization for equipment integrity. In 1998, he retired from ExxonMobil, and joined Becht Engineering, where he became senior engineering fellow.

Sims was awarded the ASME Dedicated Service Award in 1995, and the Melvin R. Green Codes and Standards Medal in 2006. In 2014-2015 he served as president of the American Society of Mechanical Engineers.

== Selected publications ==
- Sims, J. Robert. Guide to Life Cycle Management of Pressure Equipment Integrity, American Society of Mechanical Engineers, 2009.
- Sims, J. Robert. Roadmap to Develop ASME Code Rules for the Construction of High Temperature Gas Cooled Reactors (HTGRS). ASME Standards Technology LLC, 2012.

Articles, a selection

- DePadova, Tracy A., and J. Robert Sims. "Fitness for service local thin areas comparison of finite element analysis to physical test results." No. CONF-950740--. American Society of Mechanical Engineers, New York, NY (United States), 1995.
- Han, K., Embury, J. D., Sims, J. R., Campbell, L. J., Schneider-Muntau, H. J., Pantsyrnyi, V. I., ... & Vorobieva, A. (1999). "The fabrication, properties and microstructure of Cu–Ag and Cu–Nb composite conductors." Materials Science and Engineering: A, 267(1), 99-114.

Patents, a selection

- Sims, J. Robert, "Process energy recovery," patent US 4288406 A,
- Sims, J. Robert, "Apparatus and method for recovering energy from pressurised reactor effluent," patent EP 0044738 A1, Jan 27, 1982
- Sims Jr, J. Robert, Willard N. Mitchell, and Charles W. Williamson. "Process for tubular water-bath polypropylene films." U.S. Patent No. 4,203,942. 20 May 1980.
