= Bernards Township, New Jersey =

Township in Somerset County, New Jersey, US

- Township
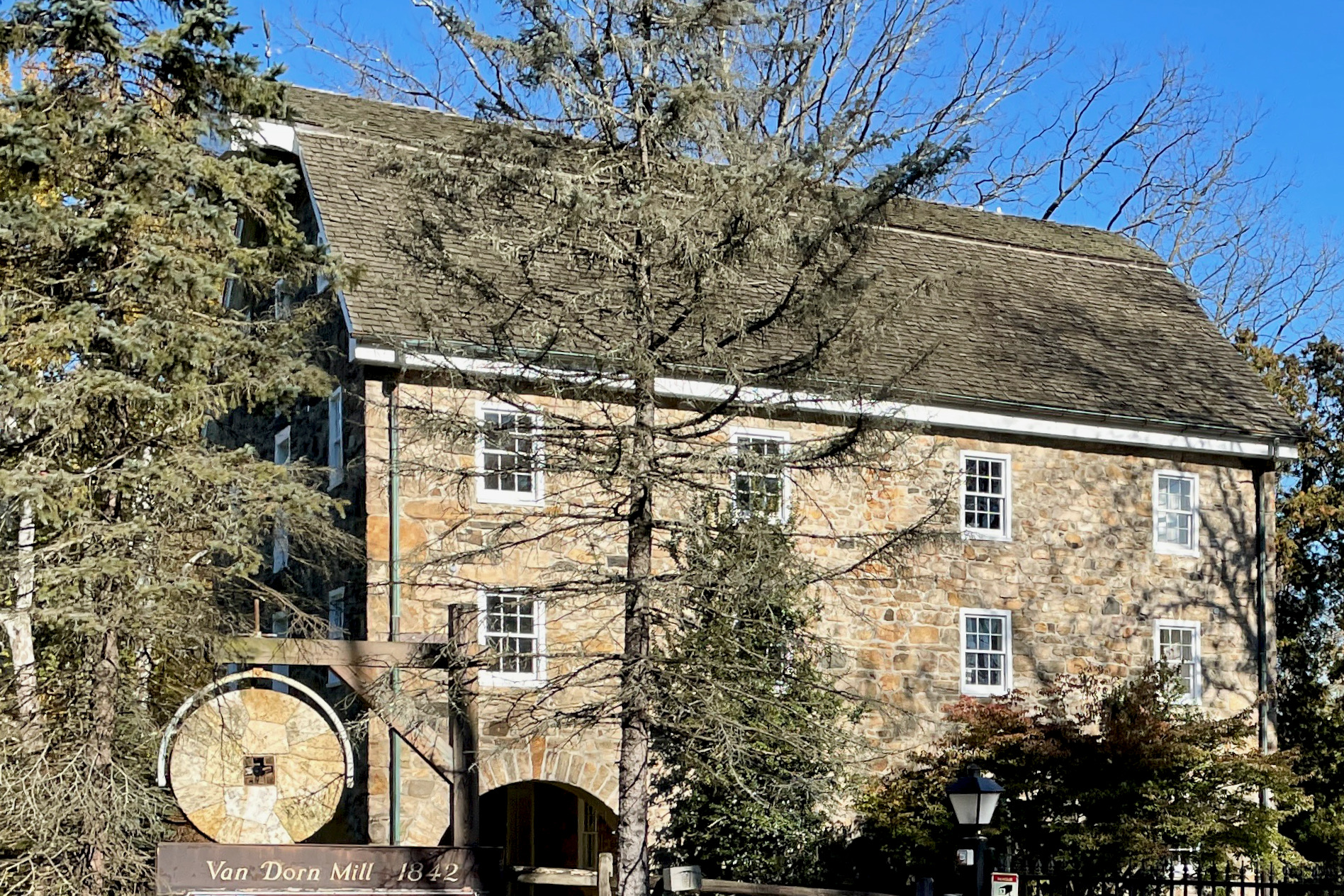
- Van Dorn's Mill in Franklin Corners

- Flag

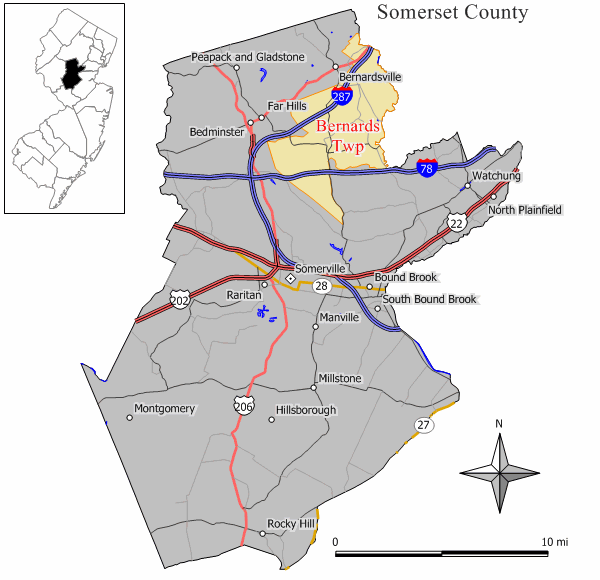
- Location of Bernards Township in Somerset County highlighted in yellow (right). Inset map: Location of Somerset County in New Jersey highlighted in black (left).

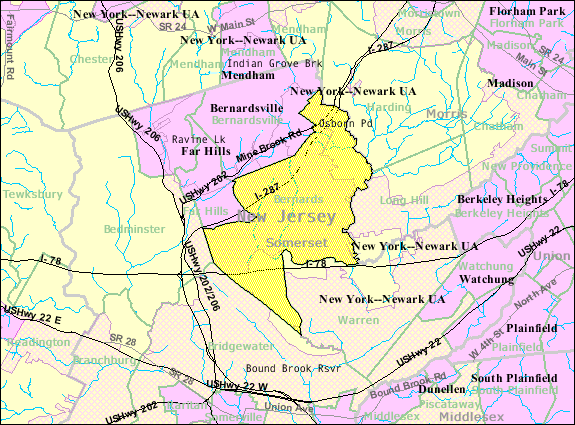
- Census Bureau map of Bernards Township, New Jersey

- Location in Somerset County Location in New Jersey Location in the United States
- Coordinates: 40.677455°N 74.567277°W
- Country: United States
- State: New Jersey
- County: Somerset
- Royal charter: May 24, 1760
- Incorporated: February 21, 1798
- Named for: Sir Francis Bernard, 1st Baronet

Government
  - Type: Township
  - Body: Township Committee
  - Mayor: Ana Duarte McCarthy (D, term ends December 31, 2026)
  - Administrator: Pat Monaco
  - Municipal clerk: Christine V. Kieffer

Area
  - Total: 24.33 sq mi (63.01 km^{2})
  - Land: 24.20 sq mi (62.68 km^{2})
  - Water: 0.13 sq mi (0.33 km^{2}) 0.52%
  - Rank: 112th of 565 in state 6th of 21 in county
- Elevation: 249 ft (76 m)

Population (2020)
  - Total: 27,830
  - Estimate (2023): 28,100
  - Rank: 89th of 565 in state 4th of 21 in county
  - Density: 1,150/sq mi (440/km^{2})
  - Rank: 368th of 565 in state 11th of 21 in county
- Time zone: UTC−05:00 (Eastern (EST))
  - Summer (DST): UTC−04:00 (Eastern (EDT))
- ZIP Code: 07920, 07939 – Basking Ridge; 07938 – Liberty Corner; 07939 – Lyons; 07931 – Far Hills
- Area code: 908
- FIPS code: 3403505560
- GNIS feature ID: 0882174
- Website: www.bernards.org

Bernards Township (/ˈbɜːrnərdz/) is a township in Somerset County, in the U.S. state of New Jersey. As of the 2020 United States census, the township's population was 27,830, an increase of 1,178 (+4.4%) from the 2010 census count of 26,652, reflecting an increase of 2,077 (+8.5%) from the 24,575 counted in the 2000 census.

Located on the eastern end of the Somerset Hills region, the township is a bedroom suburb of New York City in the much larger New York metropolitan area, located within the Raritan Valley region.

== History ==
Bernards Township was originally formed by royal charter on May 24, 1760, as Bernardston Township from remaining portions of Northern precinct. It was incorporated as Bernards Township by an act of the New Jersey Legislature on February 21, 1798, as one of New Jersey's initial group of 104 townships. Portions of the township were taken to form Warren Township (March 5, 1806), Far Hills (April 7, 1921) and Bernardsville (March 6, 1924). The township celebrated its 250th charter anniversary in May 2010.

A set of referendums to create independent boroughs from portions of Bernards Township were held in June 1921, which would have left only Liberty Corner and Lyons remaining in Bernards Township if all three proposals had been approved; The referendum in Far Hills passed and the vote in Bernardsville failed in 1921, but ultimately passed in 1924. Voters rejected the creation of proposed borough of Basking Ridge by a more than 4–1 margin.

The township was named for Sir Francis Bernard, 1st Baronet, who served as governor of the Province of New Jersey.

== Geography ==
According to the United States Census Bureau, the township had a total area of 24.33 square miles (63.01 km^{2}), including 24.20 square miles (62.68 km^{2}) of land and 0.13 square miles (0.33 km^{2}) of water (0.52%).

The township is roughly bounded by the Second Watchung Mountain in the southwest, the Dead River swamp on the south, the Great Swamp National Wildlife Refuge, Passaic River, and Millington Gorge in the east.

Unincorporated communities, localities and place names located partially or completely within the township include Basking Ridge, Franklin Corners, Green Knoll, Hardscrabble, The Hills (split between Bernards Township and Bedminster), Liberty Corner, Lyons, Madisonville, Mount Horeb, Somerset Mills, State Park, Stone House and White Bridge. Martinsville is an unincorporated area in Bridgewater Township, whose 08836 ZIP Code also covers portions of Bernards Township.

The township borders Bedminster Township and Far Hills to the west, Bernardsville to the northwest, Bridgewater Township to the southwest, and Warren Township to the southeast in Somerset County and Harding Township to the northeast and Long Hill to the east in Morris County.

== Demographics ==
Historical population
Census	Pop.	Note	%±
1790	2,377		—
1810	1,876		—
1820	2,063		10.0%
1830	2,062		0.0%
1840	3,986		93.3%
1850	2,267		−43.1%
1860	2,471		9.0%
1870	2,369		−4.1%
1880	2,622		10.7%
1890	2,558		−2.4%
1900	3,066		19.9%
1910	4,608		50.3%
1920	4,243		−7.9%
1930	2,293	*	−46.0%
1940	4,512		96.8%
1950	7,487		65.9%
1960	9,018		20.4%
1970	13,305		47.5%
1980	12,920		−2.9%
1990	17,199		33.1%
2000	24,575		42.9%
2010	26,652		8.5%
2020	27,830		4.4%
2023 (est.)	28,100		1.0%
Population sources: 1790–1920 1840 1850–1870; 1850 1870 1880–1890; 1890–1910 1910–1930; 1940–2000 2000; 2010 2020 * = Lost territory in previous decade.

=== 2010 census ===
The 2010 United States census counted 26,652 people, 9,783 households, and 6,897 families in the township. The population density was 1,113.6 per square mile (430.0/km^{2}). There were 10,103 housing units at an average density of 422.1 per square mile (163.0/km^{2}). The racial makeup was 81.83% (21,809) White, 1.89% (504) Black or African American, 0.08% (20) Native American, 13.80% (3,679) Asian, 0.03% (7) Pacific Islander, 0.55% (147) from other races, and 1.82% (486) from two or more races. Hispanic or Latino of any race were 3.95% (1,054) of the population.

Of the 9,783 households, 40.0% had children under the age of 18; 61.7% were married couples living together; 6.9% had a female householder with no husband present and 29.5% were non-families. Of all households, 26.6% were made up of individuals and 11.3% had someone living alone who was 65 years of age or older. The average household size was 2.65 and the average family size was 3.27.

28.8% of the population were under the age of 18, 4.3% from 18 to 24, 20.6% from 25 to 44, 32.9% from 45 to 64, and 13.5% who were 65 years of age or older. The median age was 43.1 years. For every 100 females, the population had 93.5 males. For every 100 females ages 18 and older there were 88.5 males.

The Census Bureau's 2006–2010 American Community Survey showed that (in 2010 inflation-adjusted dollars) median household income was $123,285 (with a margin of error of +/− $7,030) and the median family income was $153,906 (+/− $14,565). Males had a median income of $123,390 (+/− $9,621) versus $86,272 (+/− $9,195) for females. The per capita income for the borough was $67,809 (+/− $4,972). About 2.1% of families and 2.9% of the population were below the poverty line, including 1.3% of those under age 18 and 8.0% of those age 65 or over.

=== 2000 census ===
At the 2000 United States census there were 24,575 people, 9,242 households and 6,487 families residing in the township. The population density was 1,023.8 inhabitants per square mile (395.3/km^{2}). There were 9,485 housing units at an average density of 395.1 per square mile (152.5/km^{2}). The racial makeup of the township was 89.20% White, 1.44% African American, 0.05% Native American, 7.85% Asian, 0.01% Pacific Islander, 0.40% from other races, and 1.05% from two or more races. Hispanic or Latino people of any race were 2.63% of the population.

There were 9,242 households, of which 37.6% had children under the age of 18 living with them, 63.0% were married couples living together, 5.8% had a female householder with no husband present, and 29.8% were non-families. 26.4% of all households were made up of individuals, and 9.2% had someone living alone who was 65 years of age or older. The average household size was 2.58 and the average family size was 3.17.

Age distribution was 27.7% under the age of 18, 3.2% from 18 to 24, 31.2% from 25 to 44, 25.5% from 45 to 64, and 12.5% who were 65 years of age or older. The median age was 39 years. For every 100 females, there were 94.6 males. For every 100 females age 18 and over, there were 90.0 males.

The median income for a household in the township was $107,204, and the median income for a family was $135,806. Males had a median income of $95,758 versus $60,865 for females. The per capita income for the township was $56,521. About 0.6% of families and 1.3% of the population were below the poverty line, including 1.2% of those under age 18 and 2.9% of those age 65 or over.

== Economy ==
The headquarters of Fedders, Hitachi Power Systems USA and Verizon Wireless are located in the township. Verizon Communications, which maintains its world headquarters in New York City, has located operations of its major business units in buildings that were formerly AT&T's world headquarters.

== Government ==
=== Local government ===
Bernards Township operates under the Township form of New Jersey municipal government, one of 141 municipalities (of the 564) statewide that use this form, the second-most commonly used form of government in the state. The Township Committee is comprised of five members, who are elected directly by the voters at-large in partisan elections to serve three-year terms of office on a staggered basis, with either one or two seats coming up for election each year as part of the November general election in a three-year cycle. At an annual reorganization meeting held during the first week of January, the Township Committee selects one of its members to serve as Mayor and another as Deputy Mayor.

As of 2026, members of the Bernards Township Committee are Mayor Ana Duarte McCarthy (D, term on committee and as mayor ends December 31, 2026), Deputy Mayor John Tompkins (D, term as deputy mayor ends December 31, 2026; term on committee ends December 31, 2026), Jennifer L. Asay (R, 2027), Andrew J. McNally (R, 2027) and Brett Hodges (D, 2028).

=== Federal, state and county representation ===
Bernards Township is located in the 7th Congressional District and is part of New Jersey's 21st state legislative district.

Prior to the 2010 Census, Bernards Township had been part of the 11th Congressional District, a change made by the New Jersey Redistricting Commission that took effect in January 2013, based on the results of the November 2012 general elections.

For the 119th United States Congress, New Jersey's 7th congressional district is represented by Thomas Kean Jr. (R, Westfield). New Jersey is represented in the United States Senate by Democrats Cory Booker (Newark, term ends 2027) and Andy Kim (Moorestown, term ends 2031).

For the 2026–2027 session, the 21st legislative district of the New Jersey Legislature is represented in the State Senate by Jon Bramnick (R, Westfield) and in the General Assembly by Vincent Kearney (D, Garwood) and Andrew Macurdy (D, Summit).

Somerset County is governed by a five-member Board of County Commissioners, whose members are elected at-large to three-year terms of office on a staggered basis, with one or two seats coming up for election each year. At an annual reorganization meeting held in the first week of January, the board selects a Director and deputy director from among its members. As of 2025, Somerset County's County Commissioners are Director Shanel Robinson (D, Franklin Township, term as commissioner ends 2027; term as director ends 2026), Deputy Director Paul Drake (D, Hillsborough Township, term as commissioner and as deputy director ends 2026), Melonie Marano (D, Green Brook Township, 2028), Elizabeth Graner (D, Bernards Township, 2026; elected to serve an unexpired term) and Sara Sooy (D, Bedminster Township, 2027).

Constitutional officers, elected on a countywide basis are Clerk Steve Peter (D, Somerville, 2027), Sheriff Darrin Russo (D, Franklin Township, 2028) and Surrogate Bernice "Tina" Jalloh (D, Franklin Township, 2030).

=== Politics ===
As of March 23, 2011, there were a total of 18,377 registered voters in Bernards Township, of which 3,544 (19.3% vs. 26.0% countywide) were registered as Democrats, 7,019 (38.2% vs. 25.7%) were registered as Republicans and 7,803 (42.5% vs. 48.2%) were registered as Unaffiliated. There were 11 voters registered to as Libertarians or Greens. Among the township's 2010 Census population, 69.0% (vs. 60.4% in Somerset County) were registered to vote, including 96.9% of those ages 18 and over (vs. 80.4% countywide).

United States presidential election results for Bernards Township
Year	Republican		Democratic		Third party(ies)	
Year	No.	%	No.	%	No.	%
2024	6,819	43.60%	8,449	54.02%	373	2.38%
2020	7,086	42.45%	9,398	56.30%	208	1.25%
2016	6,795	47.77%	6,912	48.59%	518	3.64%
2012	7,879	59.16%	5,338	40.08%	101	0.76%
2008	8,078	56.41%	6,143	42.90%	99	0.69%
2004	8,364	60.76%	5,317	38.63%	84	0.61%
2000	6,366	59.87%	3,986	37.49%	281	2.64%

In the 2012 presidential election, Republican Mitt Romney received 59.2% of the vote (7,879 cast), ahead of Democrat Barack Obama with 40.1% (5,338 votes), and other candidates with 0.8% (101 votes), among the 13,383 ballots cast by the township's 19,555 registered voters (65 ballots were spoiled), for a turnout of 68.4%. In the 2008 presidential election, Republican John McCain received 8,078 votes here (56.1% vs. 46.1% countywide), ahead of Democrat Barack Obama with 6,143 votes (42.6% vs. 52.1%) and other candidates with 99 votes (0.7% vs. 1.1%), among the 14,405 ballots cast by the township's 18,039 registered voters, for a turnout of 79.9% (vs. 78.7% in Somerset County). In the 2004 presidential election, Republican George W. Bush received 8,364 votes here (60.6% vs. 51.5% countywide), ahead of Democrat John Kerry with 5,317 votes (38.5% vs. 47.2%) and other candidates with 84 votes (0.6% vs. 0.9%), among the 13,812 ballots cast by the township's 16,534 registered voters, for a turnout of 83.5% (vs. 81.7% in the whole county).

Gubernatorial election results for Bernards Township
Year	Republican		Democratic		Third party(ies)	
Year	No.	%	No.	%	No.	%
2025	5,338	45.51%	6,330	53.96%	62	0.53%
2021	5,500	52.50%	4,927	47.03%	50	0.48%
2017	4,801	55.06%	3,754	43.06%	164	1.88%
2013	6,505	77.08%	1,829	21.67%	105	1.24%
2009	6,124	59.90%	2,639	25.81%	1,460	14.28%
2005	5,800	62.23%	3,308	35.49%	213	2.29%

In the 2013 gubernatorial election, Republican Chris Christie received 77.1% of the vote (6,505 cast), ahead of Democrat Barbara Buono with 21.7% (1,829 votes), and other candidates with 1.2% (105 votes), among the 8,547 ballots cast by the township's 19,701 registered voters (108 ballots were spoiled), for a turnout of 43.4%. In the 2009 gubernatorial election, Republican Chris Christie received 6,124 votes here (59.5% vs. 55.8% countywide), ahead of Democrat Jon Corzine with 2,639 votes (25.6% vs. 34.1%), Independent Chris Daggett with 1,427 votes (13.9% vs. 8.7%) and other candidates with 33 votes (0.3% vs. 0.7%), among the 10,293 ballots cast by the township's 18,244 registered voters, yielding a 56.4% turnout (vs. 52.5% in the county).

United States Senate election results for Bernards Township1
Year	Republican		Democratic		Third party(ies)	
Year	No.	%	No.	%	No.	%
2024	7,140	46.40%	7,968	51.78%	281	1.83%
2018	5,358	43.40%	6,674	54.06%	313	2.54%
2012	7,460	58.50%	5,102	40.01%	191	1.50%
2006	5,693	60.89%	3,478	37.20%	178	1.90%

United States Senate election results for Bernards Township2
Year	Republican		Democratic		Third party(ies)	
Year	No.	%	No.	%	No.	%
2020	7,876	47.51%	8,563	51.66%	137	0.83%
2014	4,660	59.65%	3,026	38.74%	126	1.61%
2013	3,605	58.73%	2,489	40.55%	44	0.72%
2008	8,355	61.59%	5,011	36.94%	199	1.47%

== Education ==
Students in public school for pre-kindergarten through twelfth grade are served by the Bernards Township School District. As of the 2020–21 school year, the district, comprised of six schools, had an enrollment of 4,874 students and 456.1 classroom teachers (on an FTE basis), for a student–teacher ratio of 10.7:1. Schools in the district (with 2020–21 enrollment data from the National Center for Education Statistics) are Cedar Hill Elementary School with 483 students in grades K-5, Liberty Corner Elementary School with 466 students in grades K-5, Mount Prospect Elementary School with 507 students in grades PreK-5, Oak Street Elementary School with 406 students in grades K-5, William Annin Middle School with 1,201 students in grades 6-8 and Ridge High School with 1,794 students in grades 9-12. The district offers its Integrated Preschool Program for children on the autism spectrum, utilizing the principles of applied behavior analysis.

During the 2009–10 school year, Ridge High School was awarded the National Blue Ribbon School Award of Excellence by the United States Department of Education, the highest award an American school can receive. The school had also won the award for the 1986–1987 school year. Mount Prospect Elementary School was one of 11 in the state to be recognized in 2014 by the United States Department of Education's National Blue Ribbon Schools Program. In 2015, Liberty Corner School was one of 15 schools in New Jersey, and one of nine public schools, recognized as a National Blue Ribbon School in the exemplary high performing category.

Ridge High School was ranked 194th, the second-highest in New Jersey, in Newsweek magazine's 2010 rankings of America's Best High Schools. The school was the 9th-ranked public high school in New Jersey out of 328 schools statewide, in New Jersey Monthly magazine's September 2010 cover story on the state's "Top Public High Schools", after being ranked 12th in 2010 out of 322 schools. The Ridge High School was ranked 37th best in America in 2015 by Newsweek.

Pingry School, a private coeducational college preparatory day school, has its upper campus, for grades 6 to 12, located in Basking Ridge (prior to 2013 the campus was listed as being located in Martinsville).

Saint James School is a parochial elementary school for students in preschool through eighth grade that operates under the supervision of the Roman Catholic Diocese of Metuchen. In 2024, the school was one of 11 statewide that was recognized as a Blue Ribbon School of Excellence by the United States Department of Education.

== Transportation ==
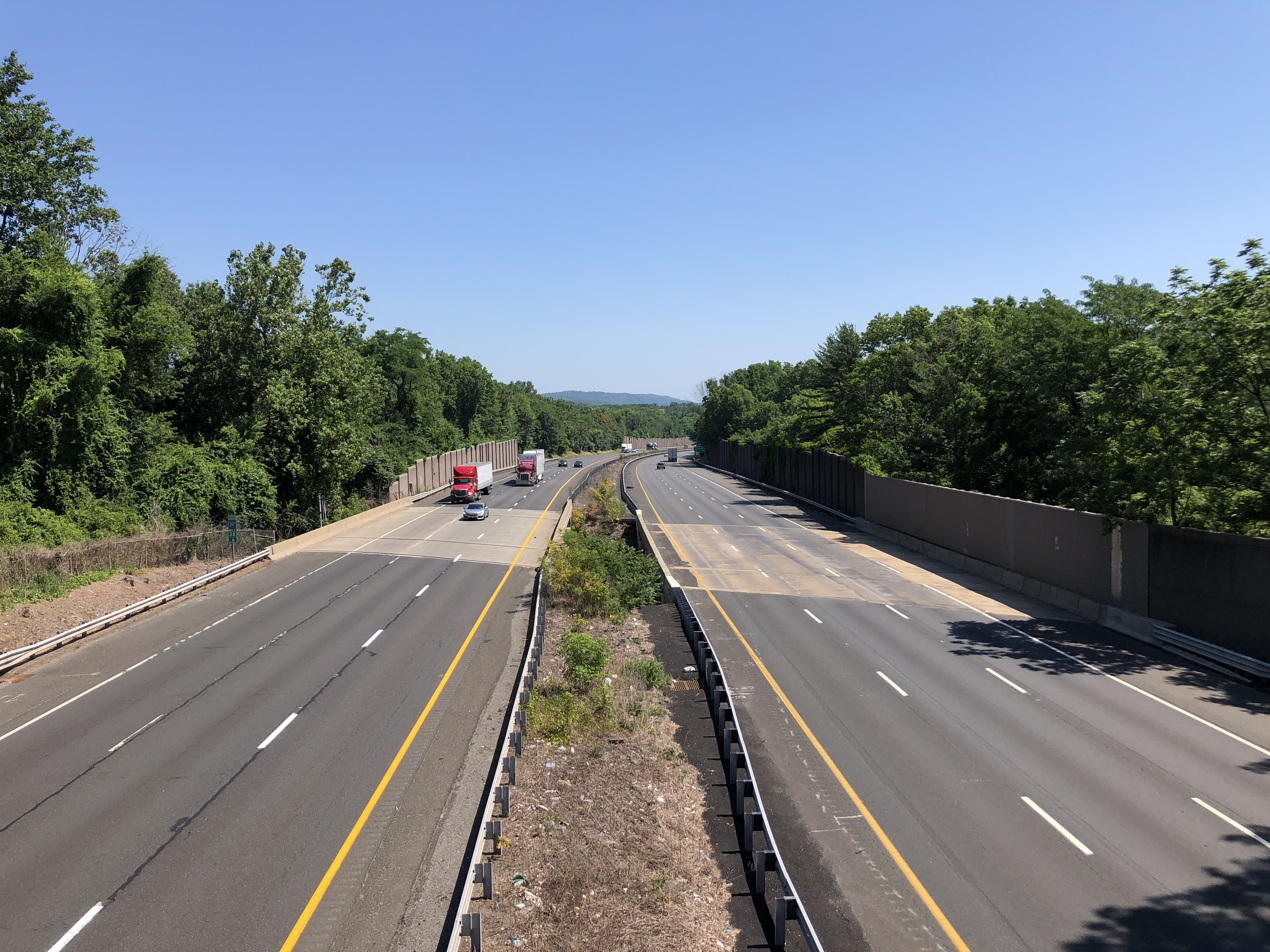
Interstate 287 northbound in Bernards Township

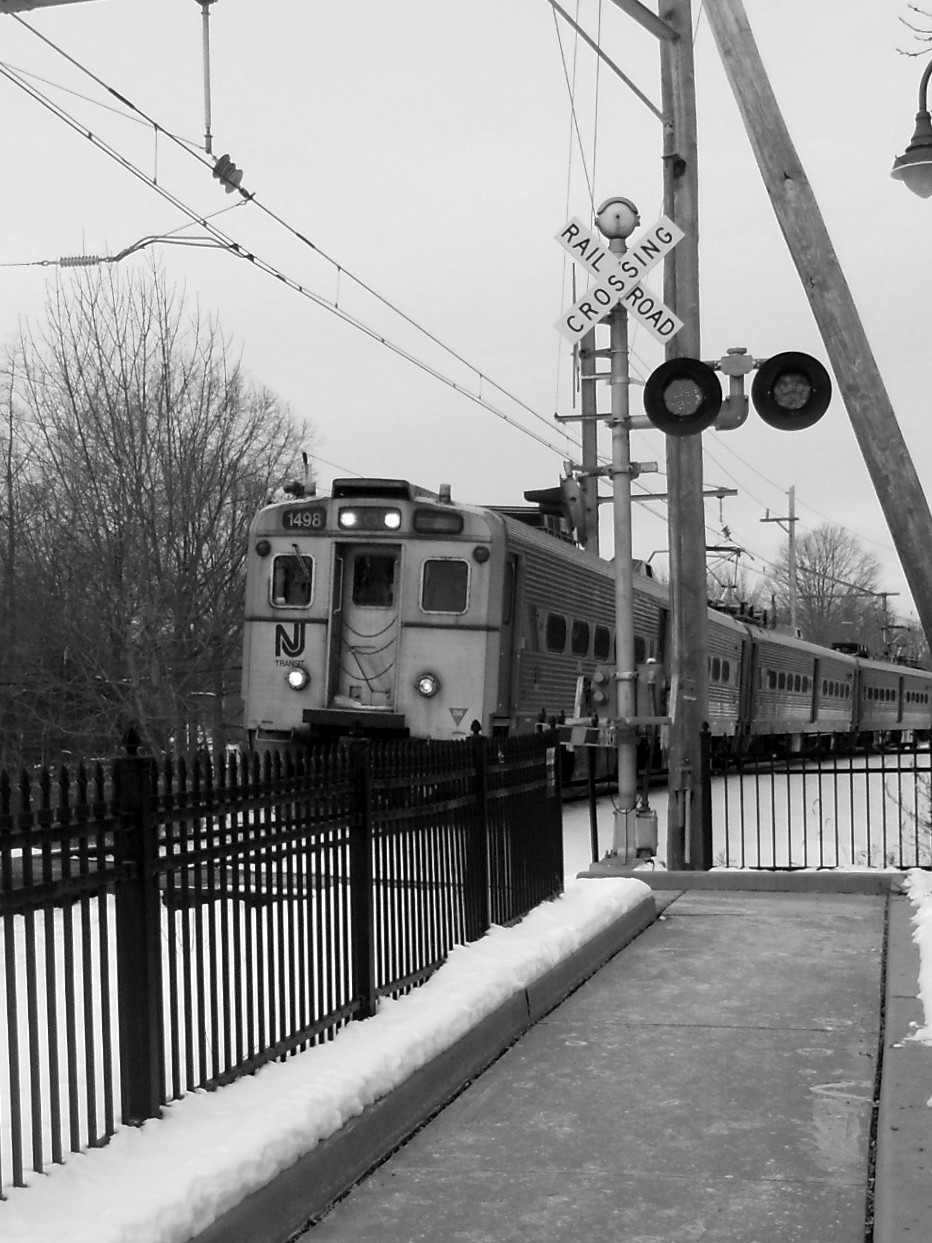
Lyons train station in Bernards Township

=== Roads and highways ===
As of May 2010, the township had a total of 138.86 miles (223.47 km) of roadways, of which 109.20 miles (175.74 km) were maintained by the municipality, 21.13 miles (34.01 km) by Somerset County and 8.53 miles (13.73 km) by the New Jersey Department of Transportation.

Major roads serving Bernards Township include Interstate 78, Interstate 287 and U.S. Route 202.

=== Public transportation ===
NJ Transit train service is available at the Basking Ridge station and Lyons station on the Gladstone Branch, providing service between Gladstone and Hoboken Terminal.

Lakeland Bus Lines provides Route 78 rush-hour service from Bedminster to the Port Authority Bus Terminal in Midtown Manhattan.

== Points of interest ==
- Alward Farmhouse
- Basking Ridge Presbyterian Church and Cemetery – listed on the National Register of Historic Places
- The Brick Academy – A restoration of what was known as the Basking Ridge Classical School, a prep school for those hoping to attend Princeton University. The Brick Academy is the current home of the Historical Society of the Somerset Hills.
- Town Hall and Astor Estate
- Franklin Corners Historic District – Includes Van Dorn's Mill and the Grain House Restaurant, listed on the NRHP
- Liberty Corner Village
- Lyons VA Medical Center – A Veterans Administration Hospital with Classical Revival style brick buildings, listed on the NRHP
- The Devil's Tree – A solitary oak tree in a field off Mountain Road in the southern corner of the township that has been subject of several stories in Weird NJ magazine
- Kennedy–Martin–Stelle Farmstead – Farmstead Arts Center, listed on the NRHP
- Boudinot–Southard Farmstead – Also known as the Ross Farm, listed on the NRHP
- Southard Park
- Mountain Park
- The Mahan Collection, a museum of historic trucks and machinery.
- USGA Museum
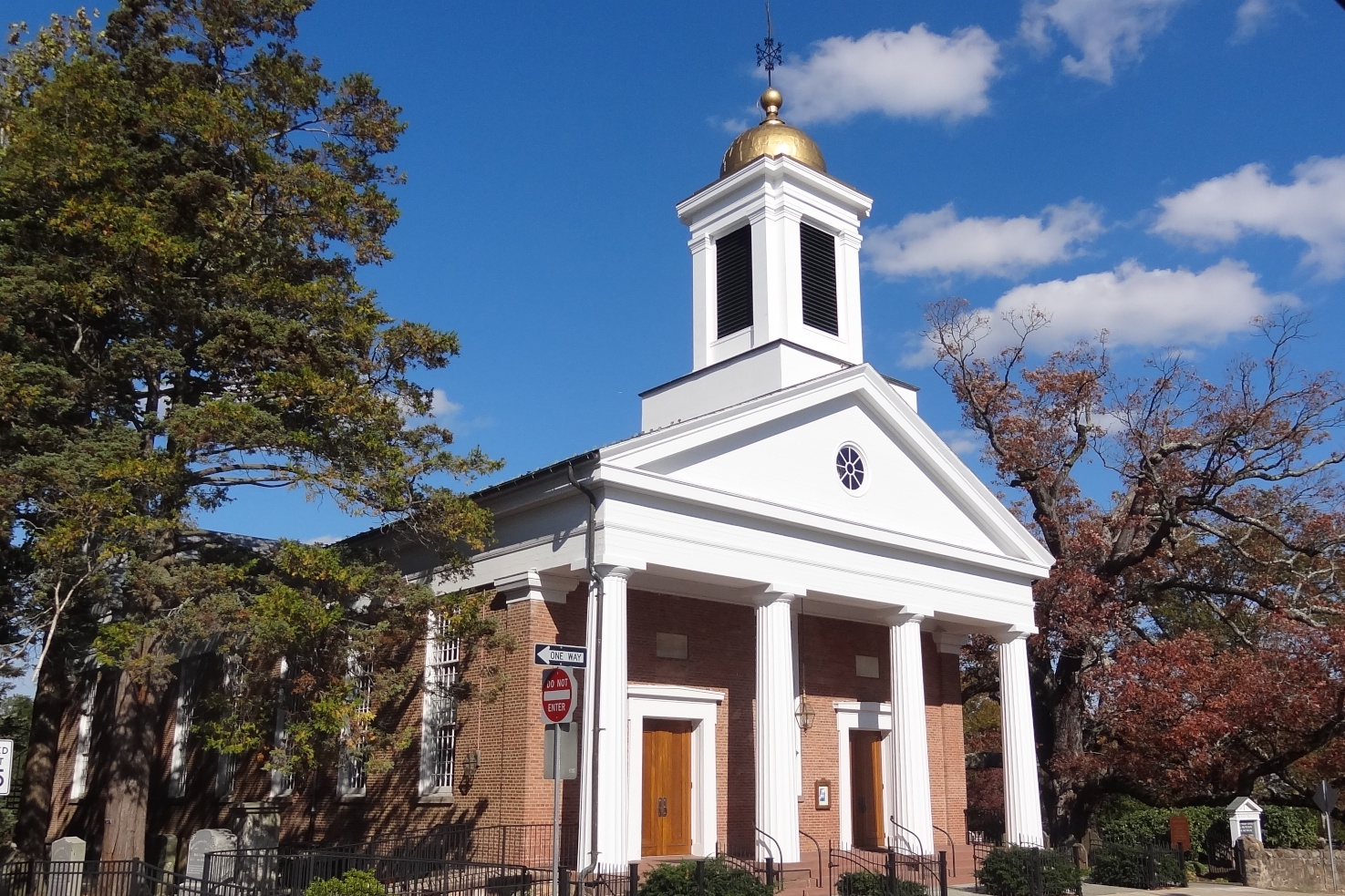
Basking Ridge Presbyterian Church

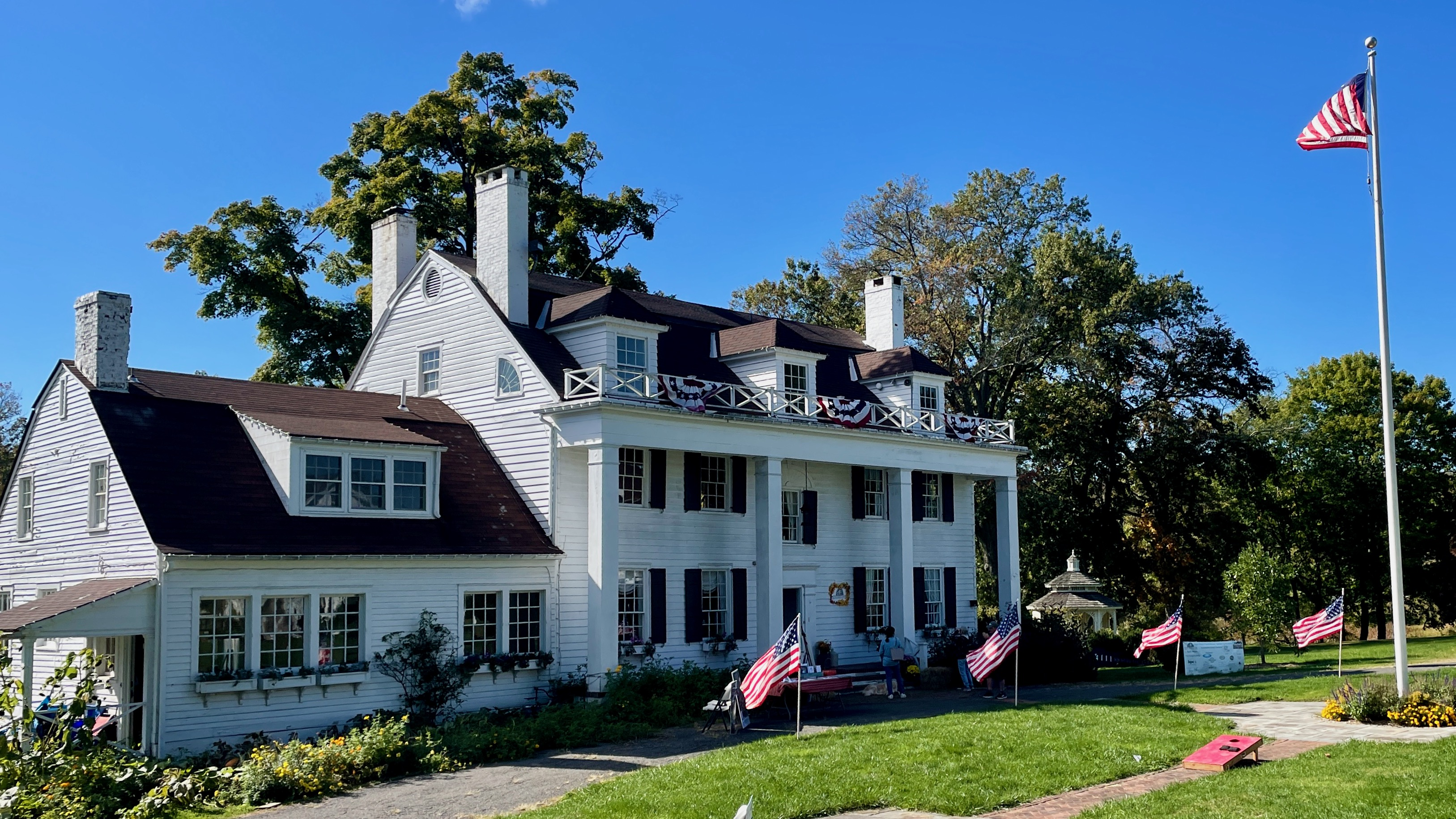
Boudinot–Southard Farmstead

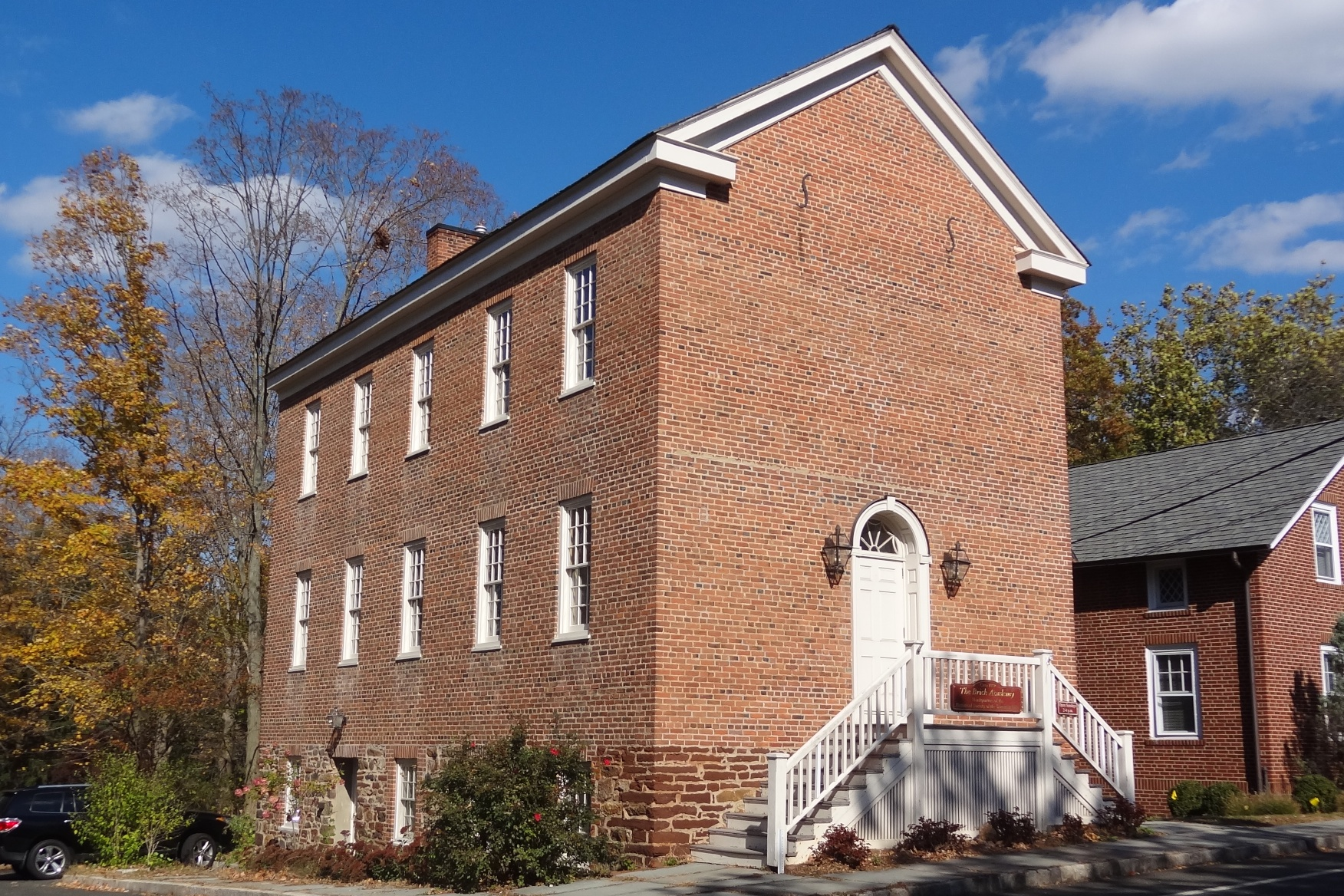
Brick Academy

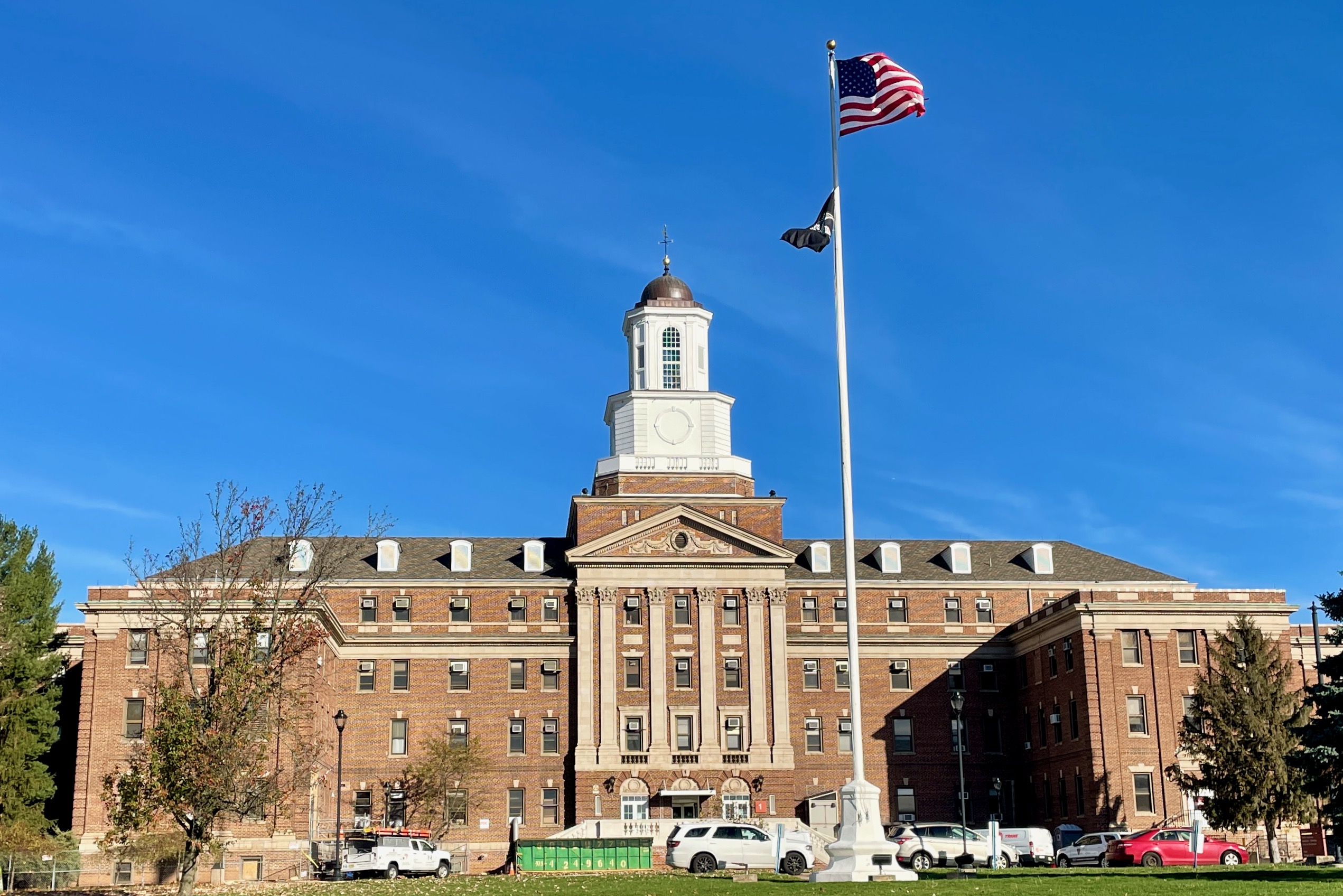
Lyons VA Medical Center

== Volunteer Effort - Terrebonne Parish ==
In 2005, after Hurricane Katrina and Hurricane Rita, which had a devastating effect on the Greater New Orleans area, the Bernards Township Regional Chamber of Commerce, under the leadership of former Mayor Albert LiCata, organized and sent truckloads of supplies to assist residents of Houma, Louisiana. In 2007, the Parish returned the favor by sending the Terrebonne High School Marching band on a 26-hour bus ride to the Bernards Township Chamber's Holiday Parade to march at their event and perform a Christmas concert for the public at a local church.

== Justice Department lawsuit ==
On November 22, 2016, the United States Department of Justice filed a lawsuit against Bernards Township, alleging "that the township violated the Religious Land Use and Institutionalized Persons Act (RLUIPA) when it denied zoning approval to allow the Islamic Society of Basking Ridge to build a mosque on land it owns."

In January 2017 the township hired Trenton-based Burton Trent Public Affairs for up to $45,000 to help manage the negative publicity associated with the Justice Department's allegations.

== Notable people ==
People who were born in, residents of, or otherwise closely associated with Bernards Township include:

- William Alexander, Lord Stirling (1726–1783), Continental Army major general during the American Revolutionary War
- John Jacob Astor VI (1912–1992), socialite, shipping businessman and member of the Astor family.
- J. C. Chandor (born 1974), Academy Award-nominated writer/director of the 2011 film Margin Call
- Chris Daggett (born 1950), President and CEO of the Geraldine R. Dodge Foundation who ran as an independent candidate in the 2009 New Jersey gubernatorial election
- Marc Del Gaizo (born 1999), professional ice hockey defenseman for the Nashville Predators of the National Hockey League
- Scott Fischer (1955–1996), climber and guide who was the first American to climb Lhotse, the fourth-highest mountain in the world, who died during an attempt to climb Mount Everest in the 1996 Everest Disaster
- Patricia Lee Gauch (born 1934), author of over 30 works of children's literature; inducted into the New Jersey Literary Hall of Fame in 1993
- Jarryd Goldberg (born 1985), former professional soccer player who played for Miami FC
- Jeff Grace, comedian, screenwriter, film producer, film director and actor; directed Folk Hero & Funny Guy
- Jon Gutwillig (born 1974), guitarist of the Disco Biscuits
- Tobin Heath (born 1988), soccer player and member of the United States women's national team who won a gold medal as youngest member of the US team in the 2008 Olympics
- Jared Isaacman (born 1983), entrepreneur, pilot, philanthropist and commercial astronaut
- Vincent R. Kramer (1918–2001), United States Marine Corps colonel who was a guerrilla warfare expert and was awarded the Navy Cross during the Korean War
- Peter Kuhn (1955–2009), race car driver who won both the USAC and SCCA Formula Super Vee championships in 1980
- George Ludlow Lee Sr. (1901–1966), chairman of the board of Red Devil, Inc.
- Philip Lindsley (1786–1855), Presbyterian minister, educator, and classicist; acting president of the College of New Jersey (now Princeton University), 1822–1824
- Kelly-Anne Lyons (born 1985), actress, television presenter, writer and model, who starred in the BBC comedy Dick and Dom's Funny Business
- Max Mahoney (born 1998, class of 2016), professional basketball player for VfL Kirchheim Knights of the ProA
- Page McConnell (born 1963), keyboardist best known for his work with the rock band Phish
- Robert Mulcahy (1932–2022), athletic director at Rutgers University
- Akshay Nanavati (born 1984), United States Marine Corps veteran, speaker, entrepreneur, ultra runner and author of Fearvana
- Jasbir Puar (born 1967), queer theorist, Professor of Women and Gender Studies at Rutgers University and author of The Right to Maim
- Perry Scott (1917–1988), American football player and coach, who played in the NFL for the Detroit Lions
- Helen J. Shen (born 1999/2000), actress and singer, known for her roles on and off-Broadway
- J. Robert Sims (born c. 1941), chemical / mechanical engineer and inventor, who served as president of the American Society of Mechanical Engineers
- Samuel Lewis Southard (1787–1842), U.S. Senator, Secretary of the Navy, and the 10th Governor of New Jersey
- Mike Tannenbaum (born 1969), former general manager of the New York Jets
- LaDainian Tomlinson (born 1979), former NFL running back who played for the New York Jets
- Kelly Williford (born 1994), professional tennis player
- Zip the Pinhead (c. 1842–1926), turn-of-the-century sideshow performer who was born in Liberty Corner as William Henry Johnson
