= February 1970 =

Month of 1970

<<	February 2026					>>
Su	Mo	Tu	We	Th	Fr	Sa
1	2	3	4	5	6	7
8	9	10	11	12	13	14
15	16	17	18	19	20	21
22	23	24	25	26	27	28

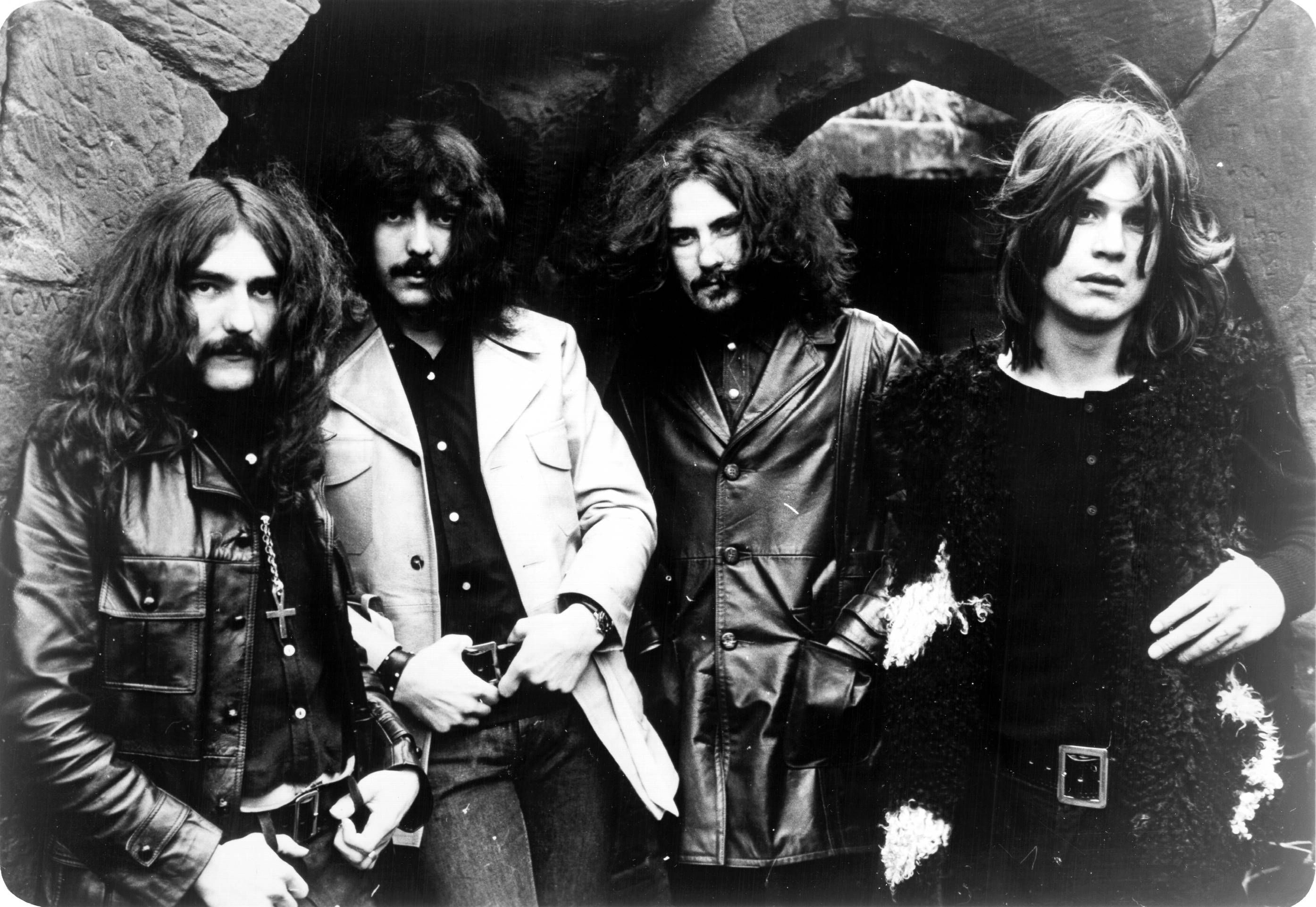
February 13, 1970: Black Sabbath inaugurates heavy metal era

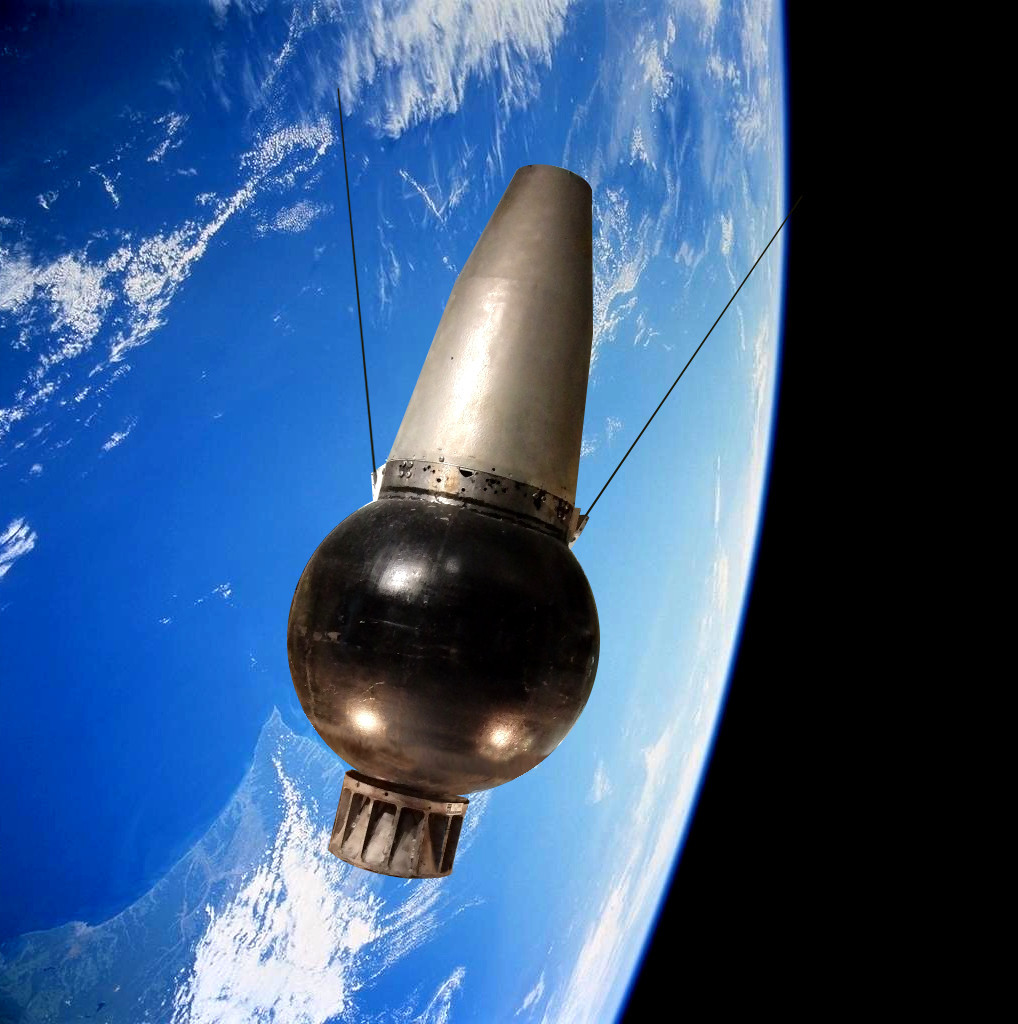
February 11, 1970: Japan becomes fourth nation to orbit a satellite

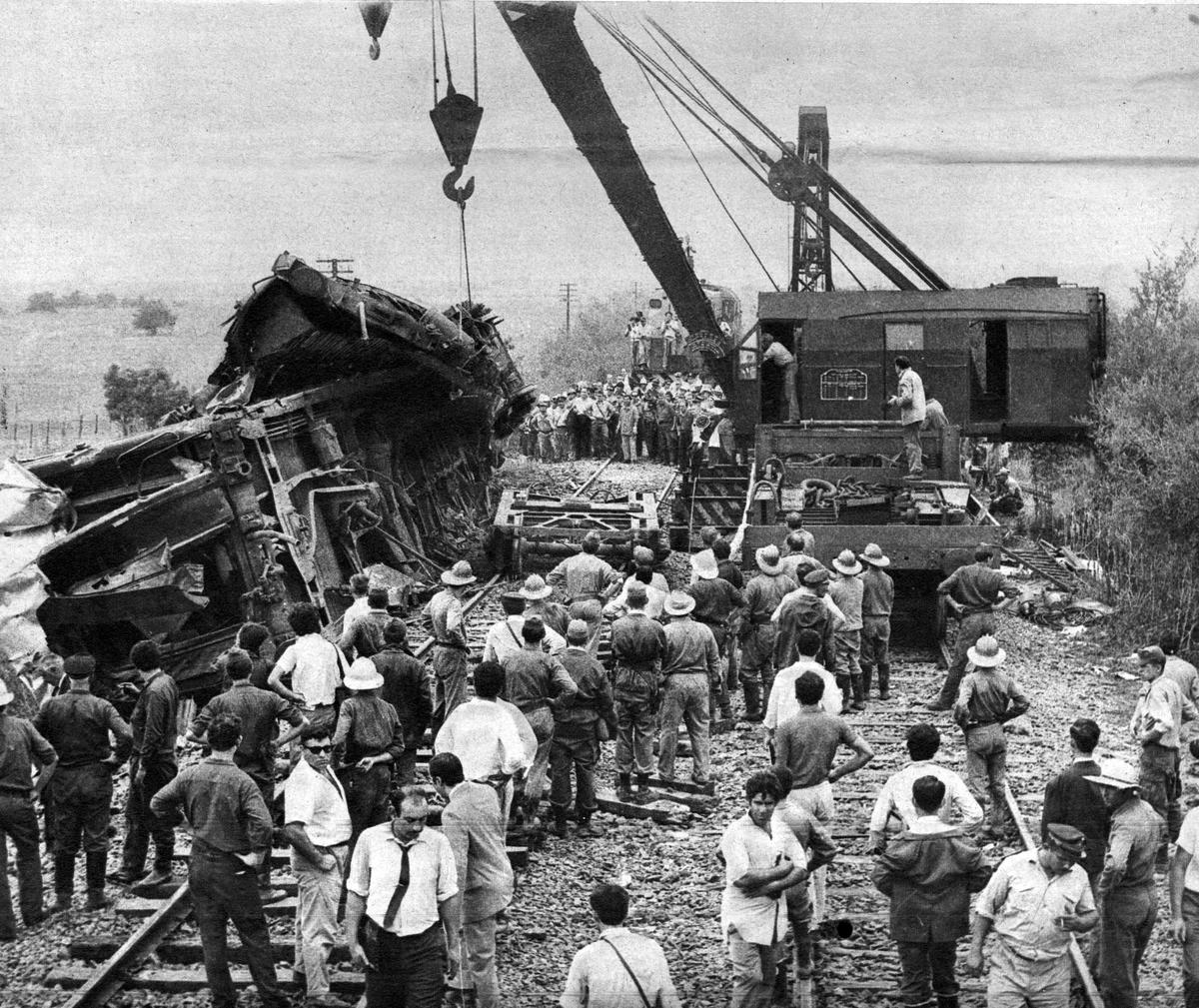
February 1, 1970: Argentinian train wreck kills 236 commuters

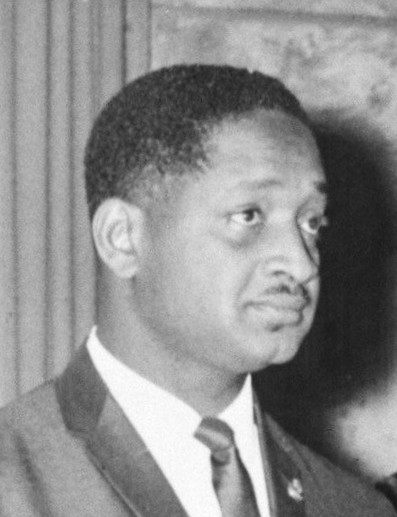
February 23, 1970: Burnham declares Guyana as the first "Co-operative Republic"

The following events occurred in February 1970:

== February 1, 1970 (Sunday) ==
- At least 236 people were killed, and 360 injured in Argentina's worst railroad disaster. The high speed luxury train "La Mixta" was 25 miles (40 km) north of Buenos Aires at the end of a 925 mi (1,489 km) trip from Tucuman, and carried about 400 passengers in 21 rail cars. Ahead, a commuter train that was crowded with 1,000 passengers in 10 crowded cars, had stalled on the same tracks, but there was no signal to warn the luxury train, which was moving at 65 miles per hour (105 km/h) before impact. Most of the casualties of the wreck were on the commuter train.
- Voting took place in Costa Rica for a new president and for the 57-seat Asamblea Legislativa, the unicameral legislature. Former President José Figueres Ferrer, who had served from 1948 to 1949 and from 1953 to 1958, was elected to a four-year term over former President Mario Echandi Jiménez, and Ferrer's National Liberation Party won 32 of the 57 seats in the Asamblea.
- Born: Malik Sealy, American pro basketball player in the NBA, 1992–2000; in the Bronx, New York (killed in auto accident, 2000)

== February 2, 1970 (Monday) ==
- U.S. President Richard M. Nixon sent the annual government budget proposal to Congress, sharply curtailing the American crewed space program and raising the amount to be spent on welfare programs. The amount of money budgeted for government programs for the 1971 fiscal year was a little more than 200 billion dollars USD. Fifty years later, the budget for FY 2020 would be 23 times higher, at 4,700 billion dollars ($4.7 trillion)
- Died: Bertrand Russell, 97, British philosopher, anti-war activist and logician; 1950 Nobel Prize in Literature laureate

== February 3, 1970 (Tuesday) ==
- NASA made its second, and more successful launch of a rocket with electrostatic ion thrusters, as it put the SERT-2 probe into a polar orbit around the Earth. The SERT-2 was sent up from Vandenberg Air Force Base in California at 6:50 in the evening local time. On July 20, 1964, the first SERT (an acronym for Space Electric Rocket Test) operated for 31 minutes. SERT-2 remained in orbit for more than 11 years, and its two mercury engine thrusters successfully operated for 3,781 hours and 2,011 hours (157 days and 84 days).
- Born:
  - Warwick Davis, 3'6" English film actor; in Epsom, Surrey
  - Keith Carney, American ice hockey player with 1018 NHL games over 18 seasons from 1991 to 2008; in Providence, Rhode Island
- Died: General Italo Gariboldi, 90, Italian military officer who commanded the Italian Royal Army in the Battle of Stalingrad during World War II; Governor General of Libya in 1941

== February 4, 1970 (Wednesday) ==
- All 33 passengers and the four crew of Aerolíneas Argentinas Flight 707 were killed when the HS 748 airliner crashed during a three-stop flight between Paraguay and Argentina. The turboprop plane took off from Asunción earlier in the day and was on its way from Corrientes to Rosario, 410 miles (660 km) away. Roughly 60 miles (97 km) from Rosario, the plane flew into a turbulent cloud bank and, within seconds, plunged to the ground near the village of Loma Alta.
- Shareholders of American Motors Corporation approved AMC's purchase of the Kaiser Jeep Corporation, manufacturers of the civilian and military Jeep vehicles
- Died: Louise Bogan, 72, American poet and former United States Poet Laureate (during 1945–1946)

== February 5, 1970 (Thursday) ==
- The value of a share of Poseidon NL, an Australian nickel mining company, soared to a record high on the Australian Securities Exchange and what would prove to be its peak price of A$275 Australian dollars ($308 in U.S. dollars at the exchange rate at the time of A$1 to US$1.12) The stock opened the day at A$225 and a rush of buying increased the price dramatically before the ASX asked Poseidon for further information; when Poseidon replied that drilling had commenced at Windarra and that "A report will be made at the end of March", prices began to drop. Investors who had bought the stock in September, when it was priced at 80 cents per share ($US 0.90), made a fortune in the months after the company had announced a major discovery of a nickel deposit at Mount Windarra, near Laverton, Western Australia. By March 23, the stock price had dropped to $131.79 and was at $74 by the end of April and $46 at year's end.
- Died: Rudy York, 56, American baseball player and 1943 American League leader in home runs and RBIs

== February 6, 1970 (Friday) ==
- The village of Angmagsalik (now called Tasiilaq) in Greenland was leveled by hurricane-force winds when it was struck by a piteraq, a powerful winter wind; ten buildings were destroyed, and the rest in the town of 800 sustained damage of some sort, but the residents were prepared to take shelter and no injuries or deaths were reported. The Tasiilaq event had the highest speed winds ever recorded for such an event, reaching 90 meters/second — 200 miles per hour (320 km/h).
- Aeroflot Flight U-45 crashed in the Soviet Union's Uzbek SSR (now Uzbekistan) during its approach to Samarkand after a 162 mi (261 km) flight that had originated in Tashkent. Only 14 of the 98 people on board survived. A misreading of the radar data by an air traffic controller in Samarkand led to prematurely clearing the Ilyushin Il-18 airliner for descent, and the plane impacted on a mountain slope on the Zarafshan Range at an altitude of 1,500 metres (4,900 ft). Consistent with Soviet policy at the time, the accident was not mentioned in the media.
- The dollar became the official currency of the popular tourist destination of Bermuda as the British Overseas Territory abandoned the pound and converted to decimal currency. The Bermudian dollar was given for the old money at the rate of 8 shillings, 4 pence which was the exchange rate for the British pound. Conversely, a Bermudian pound was worth $2.40 in Bermudian currency. The United Kingdom would go to decimal currency on February 15, 1971.

== February 7, 1970 (Saturday) ==
- Professional golfer Doug Sanders was struck on the head with a golf ball during the Bob Hope Desert Classic in Palm Springs, California, after being hit by an errant shot made by U.S. Vice President Spiro Agnew. Sanders had won the Desert Classic during the PGA Tour in 1966 and had been grouped with three celebrities, Agnew, Bob Hope and former movie star and U.S. Senator, George Murphy. Bruce Devlin of Australia would go on to win the PGA event.

== February 8, 1970 (Sunday) ==
- Four days after running aground on Cerberus Rock within Chedabucto Bay off of Nova Scotia, the oil tanker SS Arrow broke apart and began spilling its cargo of petroleum into the Nova Scotian waters. The discharge of 10,000 tonnes (9,800 long tons; 11,000 short tons) of oil (over 11 million liters or 3 million U.S. gallons) and befouled 300 kilometres (190 mi) of coastline. It remains the worst oil spill in Canadian history (the spill caused by the 1988 sinking of the supertanker Odyssey was 1,300 kilometres (810 mi) from Nova Scotia and drifted away from Canada).
- The U.S. religious program Hour of Power made its debuted on KTLA in the Los Angeles television market as Christian evangelist Robert H. Schuller broadcast a videotape of his previous Sunday service from his Garden Grove Community Church in Garden Grove, California. A promotion for the show read "Rev. Robert Schuller, founder-pastor of the world's first walk-in, drive-in church and author of two books on the power of 'possibility thinking,' launches a weekly series of worship services from 6,000-member church, to air by one-week delay tapes."
- Born:
  - Alonzo Mourning, American pro basketball player and Hall of Famer who played 16 seasons in the NBA from 1992 to 2008; in Chesapeake, Virginia
  - Stephanie Courtney, American comedienne and actress best known as "Flo", the spokesperson for Progressive Insurance in more than 100 TV commercials; in Stony Point, New York

== February 9, 1970 (Monday) ==
- An explosion in the kitchen of the Venezuelan merchant ship Pampatar, and the subsequent fire and panic in the evacuation, killed 24 of the 27 sailors on board. The ship was 10 miles off of the coast of La Guaira; the captain, Luis Martinez, survived and reported that some of the crewmen who jumped overboard had been attacked by sharks while awaiting rescue.
- Born:
  - Glenn McGrath, Australian cricket bowler; in Dubbo, New South Wales
  - Todd Rokita, Indiana U.S. congressman 2011–2019, current Attorney General of Indiana; in Chicago, Illinois

== February 10, 1970 (Tuesday) ==
- An avalanche of snow killed at least 39 young skiers as it smashed into the bottom floors of a chalet at the Alpine resort of Val-d'Isère in France. At 8:05 in the morning, as residents were having breakfast, more than 100,000 cubic yards of snow and debris swept down the crest of the Le Dome mountain of the Vanoise Massif range. Residents had only seconds to get out after a tremendous roar heralded the approach of the debris.
- Born: Ardy Wiranata, Indonesian badminton player and 1991 Badminton World Cup men's singles champion; in Jakarta
- Died: Tobias Geffen, 99, American Jewish Orthodox rabbi who certified Coca-Cola as kosher after the company revealed the secret ingredients to him in 1935, and had made minor changes on his recommendation.

== February 11, 1970 (Wednesday) ==
- Japan became the fourth nation (after the Soviet Union, the United States and France) to launch a rocket and a satellite into orbit, as it sent Ohsumi skyward from the Uchinoura Space Center near Kimotsuki on the island of Kyushu at 1:25 in the afternoon local time (04:25 UTC)
- Born: Fredrik Thordendal, Swedish heavy metal guitarist; in Umeå

== February 12, 1970 (Thursday) ==
- Guerrillas of the Pathet Lao, the Communist organization within the Kingdom of Laos, made attacks on Laotian Army units in the "Plain of Jars" region within the Xiangkhoang Plateau, prompting the Laotian Prime Minister, Prince Souvanna Phouma, to formally request U.S. aid. Five days later, the United States expanded its role in the Vietnam War by sending three B-52 bombers to bomb Pathet Lao and North Vietnamese Army troops in Laos.
- All 10 passengers and two crew aboard a Urraca Airlines plane were killed in Colombia when the Douglas DC-3 crashed shortly after the airplane took off from Villavicencio on a flight to Inírida and was forced to return because of engine problems. The plane went down on its way back to Villavicencio.

== February 13, 1970 (Friday) ==
- The first heavy metal album, Black Sabbath went on sale in Britain. Black Sabbath had been formed in the English city of Birmingham in 1968 by guitarist and chief songwriter Tony Iommi, lead singer Ozzy Osbourne, drummer Bill Ward, and bassist Geezer Butler. Within weeks, the debut record would be the eighth bestselling rock album on the British charts, and would be released in the United States on June 1.
- Joseph L. Searles III became the first African-American broker to trade on the floor of the New York Stock Exchange. As a member of the NYSE, Searles became a general partner in the investment firm of Neuberger, Loeb and Company.
- The first print edition of The Irish Post, which has the largest circulation of a British newspaper for Great Britain's Irish community, was published.
- FH Serpentis, described as "the nova among the best observed in the whole history of astronomy" and "the first observed in almost every part of the electromagnetic spectrum" was discovered by Japanese astronomer Minoru Honda, roughly 2,934 years after the event (based on its estimated distance of 900 parsecs).
- Sixty-eight civilian workers were killed in Egypt, and another 98 injured, after Israeli Air Force bombers dropped napalm and delayed fuse bombs on a scrap metal factory. The IAF raid had intended to strike military targets near Abu Zaabal, north of Cairo, and hit the factory by mistake. The early morning raid occurred while many of the employees were eating breakfast before beginning their shifts. In an unprecedented move, Israel's Defense Minister Moshe Dayan disclosed that at least one of the IAF bombs had a 24-hour delay, and asked the International Red Cross to notify the Egyptian government immediately.

== February 14, 1970 (Saturday) ==
- North Korea released 39 of the South Korean 46 passengers that it had held after the hijacking of a Korean Air Lines airplane and allowed them to return to South Korea at the DMZ in Panmunjom. The other seven passengers, both stewardesses, the pilot and co-pilot were not allowed to leave and, more than 50 years later, their fate remained unknown

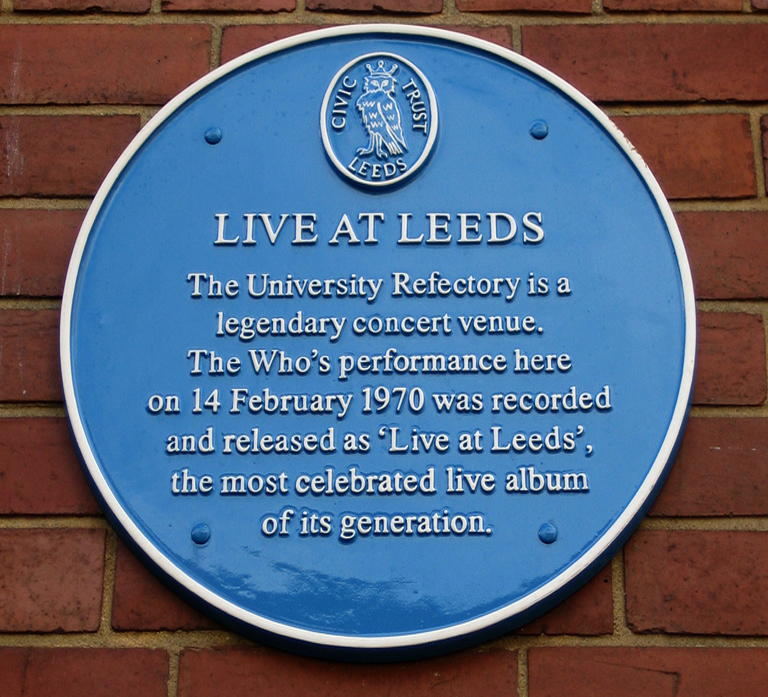
Blue plaque at the Refectory

- The British rock band The Who performed a concert at the 2,100 seat University of Leeds Refectory in England. Recorded at the concert, the record album Live at Leeds was described by Nik Cohn of The New York Times as "the best live rock album ever made" and by another critic as "one of the gold standards in live rock & roll"
- The best-selling novel of 1970, Love Story, was released by Harper & Row on Valentine's Day, after readers had gotten a preview of excerpts in the February 1970 issue of The Ladies' Home Journal. In 1969, author Erich Segal had written the screenplay for a film that would be released at the end of 1970 by Paramount Pictures, and the studio hired him to write a novelization of his script in order to generate advance publicity.
- Born:
  - Simon Pegg, English film and TV actor and comedian; in Brockworth, Gloucestershire
  - Sean Hill, American ice hockey defender who played 17 NHL seasons from 1991 to 2009; in Duluth, Minnesota
- Died:
  - Arthur Edeson, 78, pioneering American cinematographer who (in 1929) developed location filming of sound pictures by concealment of microphones
  - Harry Stradling, 68, American cinematographer and winner of two Academy Awards (in 1945 and 1964)
  - Sasha Siemel, 80, Latvian-born adventurer and explorer in South America
  - Bert Strudwick, 90, English cricketer with 1,493 dismissals, third highest in first class cricket

== February 15, 1970 (Sunday) ==
- All 102 people were killed in the crash of the Dominicana Airlines jet that was taking them from the Dominican Republic to Puerto Rico. Shortly after its takeoff from Santo Domingo toward San Juan, the twin engine DC-9 airliner lost its right engine. As the pilot was preparing to return to the airport, the left engine failed as well and the plane crashed into the Caribbean Sea. An investigation later determined that water had leaked into the aviation fuel, causing the engines to fail. The Puerto Rican women's volleyball team was killed in the crash, as was the first Dominican world champion boxer, Carlos Cruz, who held the lightweight championship in 1968 and 1969.
- Born: Shepard Fairey, American artist and designer; in Charleston, South Carolina

== February 16, 1970 (Monday) ==
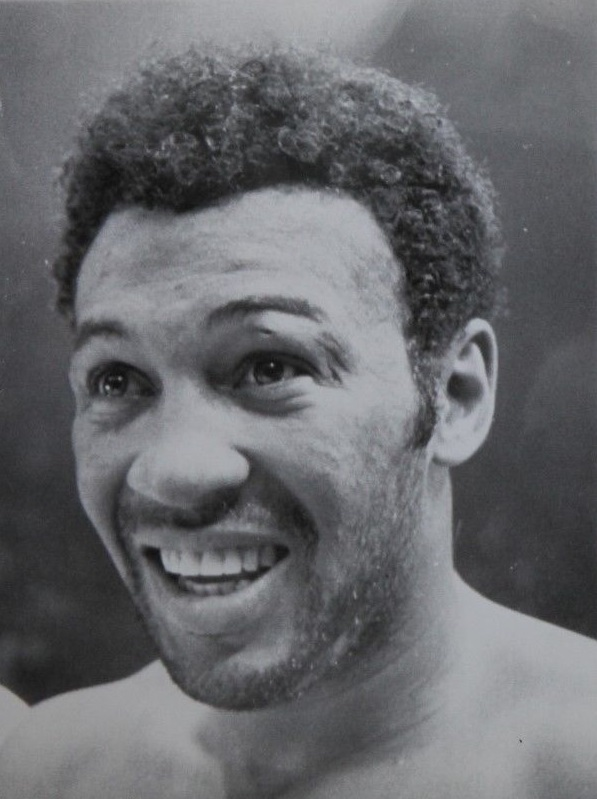
WBC's Frazier and WBA's Ellis
- In a professional bout to determine the undisputed heavyweight boxing champion of the world, World Boxing Council champion Joe Frazier knocked out Jimmy Ellis, holder of the World Boxing Association, in the fifth round of a fight at Madison Square Garden in New York.

== February 17, 1970 (Tuesday) ==
- U.S. Army Captain and physician, Dr. Jeffrey R. MacDonald, told police at Fort Bragg, North Carolina, that a "hippie-type band of three men and a blonde girl" had invaded his apartment and stabbed his pregnant wife and his two daughters to death. According to MacDonald, who had stab wounds, the blonde girl mumbled "Acid is groovy"; "Kill the pigs"; and "Hit 'em again", then scrawled the word "pig" in blood on the headboard of his bed. Detectives with the U.S. Army's Criminal Investigation Division (CID) doubted Dr. MacDonald's story. Within six weeks of the killings, CID began interrogating MacDonald as a suspect. The Army confined him to quarters and relieved him of duty, and, on May 1, the U.S. Army would arrest him and charge him with the triple murder. As of the end of 2018, MacDonald remained imprisoned after a federal appellate court affirmed the a lower court denying him a new trial
- Born: Tommy Moe, American alpine ski racer and 1994 Olympic gold medalist; in Missoula, Montana
- Died:
  - Dr. Peyton Rous, 90, American virologist and 1966 Nobel Prize in Medicine laureate for his finding that cancer could be transmitted by a virus
  - S. Y. Agnon, 81, Austro-Hungarian-born Israeli novelist and 1966 Nobel Prize in Literature laureate
  - Alfred Newman, 69, American film score composer and conductor, and winner of nine Academy Awards

== February 18, 1970 (Wednesday) ==
- After five months, the trial of the "Chicago Seven" – American antiwar activists Abbie Hoffman, Jerry Rubin, David Dellinger, Tom Hayden, Rennie Davis, John Froines, and Lee Weiner – concluded with a federal district court jury acquitting the group of charges of conspiracy to foment the rioting that took place at the 1968 Democratic National Convention. Froines and Weiner were acquitted of all charges, while the remaining five were convicted of crossing state lines in order to incite a riot. On February 20, Judge Julius Hoffman (no relation to Abbie Hoffman) sentenced each of the convicted men to five years in prison and a fine of $5,000, as well as ordering them to pay the costs of their prosecution, while defense attorney William Kunstler was sentenced to four years and 13 days imprisonment for contempt of court. After Kunstler stated that "I think it is wrong legally and morally" to issue sentences so quickly after trial, Judge Hoffman replied, "To say I am morally wrong can only add to your present troubles." On February 28, the Seventh Circuit Court of Appeals ordered the men to be released from jail, on bond. On November 21, 1972, their convictions were overturned by the appellate court.
- Born: Raine Maida, Canadian singer and musician, frontman of Our Lady Peace, in Weston, Ontario

== February 19, 1970 (Thursday) ==
- Eleven children and five women were killed by a group of United States Marines in the village of Son Thang in South Vietnam's Quảng Nam Province. Four members of a patrol unit of the 1st Battalion of the 7th U.S.M.C. would be court-martialled on charges of murder and two would be convicted in separate trials. Private Michael A. Schwarz would originally be sentenced to life imprisonment, reduced to one year at hard labor by his commanding general, while Private Samuel G. Green's five-year prison term would be commuted to one year.
- In separate resolutions, both the U.S. House of Representatives and the U.S. Senate voted to prohibit federally-required desegregation busing, the federal court practice of ordering individual school districts to revise their sub-district boundaries maps so that African-American students would be taken by school bus to predominantly white schools rather than the closest school geographically. The House vote was 315 to 81 and the vote in the Senate was approved by voice vote rather than roll call vote. The press noted at the time that "Neither the Senate nor House amendments, even if signed into law, would stop federal courts from requiring busing."

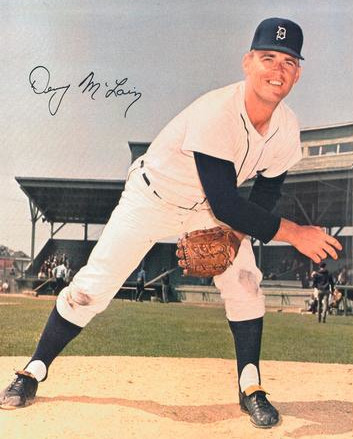
Denny McLain

- Major League Baseball pitcher Denny McLain was suspended indefinitely, a week after Sports Illustrated broke the story of his involvement with gamblers and a day after testifying before a federal grand jury. MLB Commissioner Bowie Kuhn, who announced the decision, later decided on a ban until July 1, the first 71 games of the 162 game MLB season. McLain, who had won 31 games for the Detroit Tigers in 1968 and helped them reach and win the World Series, had won his second consecutive Cy Young Award four months earlier.
- Died: Talmadge "Tab" Prince, 32, American race car driver, was killed in an accident at the Daytona International Speedway while competing in the second of two qualifying races in preparation for the 1970 Daytona 500. Prince lost control of his 1969 Dodge on the 21st of 50 laps, when his car blew its engine and went into a spin, into the path of another driver, Bill Seifert

== February 20, 1970 (Friday) ==
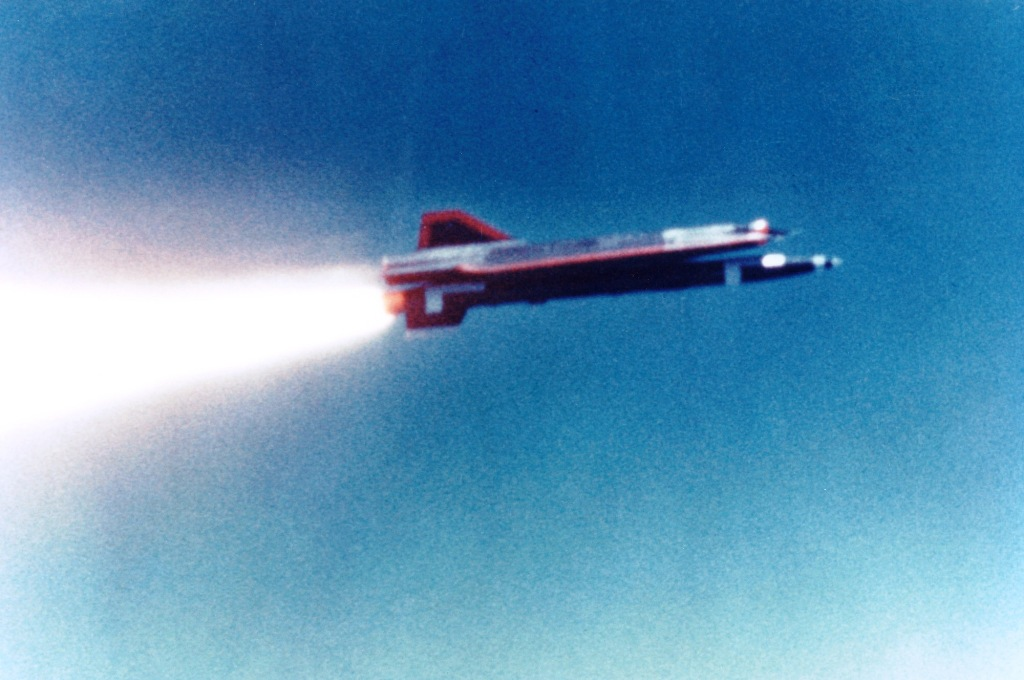
The TAGBOARD drone

- After the first mission of the supersonic D-21 TAGBOARD drone failed on November 10, the U.S. Central Intelligence Agency (CIA) made improvements to the computer software of its inertial navigation system, and "flew a completely successful test mission to validate the software" and a new "'fail-safe' feature" to allow "positive control of the drone's flight path" on aerial reconnaissance missions.

(1970 Georgia flag)

- The House of Representatives of the U.S. state of Georgia unanimously approved the Nineteenth Amendment to the United States Constitution, a day after the state Senate had done so and almost 50 years after the amendment had granted American women the right to vote. The amendment had taken effect on August 18, 1920, when Tennessee became the 36th of the then 48 U.S. states to approve it. The Georgia legislature had previously voted against ratification on July 24, 1919. Louisiana and North Carolina would follow in the next 15 months, while Mississippi would not get around to giving its ratification until March 22, 1984.
- Died: João Café Filho, 71, the 18th President of Brazil (1954 to 1955)

== February 21, 1970 (Saturday) ==
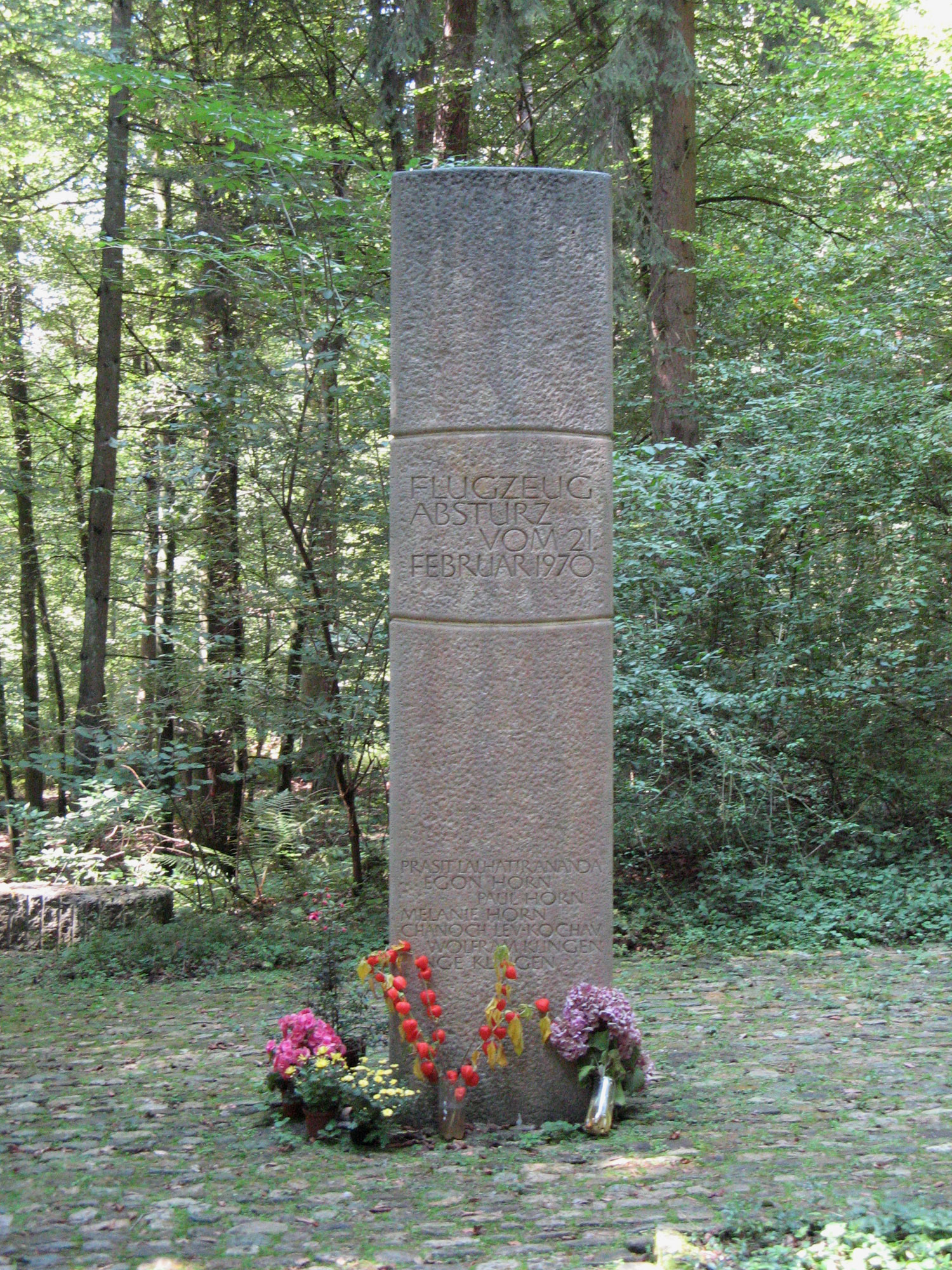
Memorial to Flight 330

- All 47 people aboard Swissair Flight 330 were killed when the Convair 990 jet was damaged in midflight by a terrorist bomb. The flight departed Zürich at 1:14 in the afternoon, bound for Tel Aviv and, seven minutes later, the bomb's barometric pressure mechanism triggered the explosion in the cargo hold when the Convair reached an altitude 4,300 metres (14,100 ft). The pilot, Karl Berlinger, turned the plane back toward Zürich upon detecting the loss in cabin pressure, and the crew realized there was fire at 1:26 before smoke filled the cabin. By 1:33, the plane was so full of smoke that the crew couldn't see the instruments and Berlinger radioed his last message to the tower (in English) — "We are crashing. Goodbye everybody." The jet crashed in the Unterwald forest, at Würenlingen, went into a dive, and impacted at a speed of 770 kilometres per hour (480 mph), obliterating the plane and everyone and everything on board.
- An end to the draft of young American men into the military was recommended by a special commission chaired by former U.S. Defense Secretary Thomas S. Gates Jr., in a report presented to President Nixon. The 15-member commission recommended that the United States shift to a force of volunteers, and that the existing draft law not be renewed after its expiration on June 30, 1971. However, Nixon would reverse his position and ask Congress to extend the draft for two more years, signing the legislation to do so on September 28, 1971
- Died: David H. Stahl, 49, judge on the U.S. Third Circuit Court of Appeals since 1968, died of carbon monoxide poisoning at his Pittsburgh home in Brookline. A coroner's investigation concluded that Judge Stahl's death had been accidental, the result of closing the door of his garage after driving home.

== February 22, 1970 (Sunday) ==
- Keith Sapsford, a 14-year-old boy from Australia, fell to his death from an airliner after trying to stowaway inside the wheel well of the DC-8 jet. Sapsford had climbed in and was lying on top of a door to the wheel compartment, which opened at an altitude of 200 feet (61 m) when the wheels of the Japan Air Lines jet were retracting. The incident was witnessed by 350 people watching from an observation deck at the Sydney International Airport, and was photographed by one of the bystanders who was testing a new camera; the picture would be reprinted in newspapers around the world.
- Voters in Senegal overwhelmingly approved a new constitution for the West African republic, re-establishing the position of Prime Minister of Senegal almost seven years after it had been abolished in a 1963 referendum. Officially, 94.3% of the registered voters turned out to cast ballots and all but 6,349 of the 1,162,060 votes were in favor of approval. Four days later, president Léopold Sédar Senghor appointed Abdou Diouf as the new prime minister.
- Died: Edward Selzer, 77, American film producer who oversaw production of the Looney Tunes series of Warner Bros. cartoons from 1944 to 1958; winner of five Academy Awards.

== February 23, 1970 (Monday) ==
Guyana flag

- The Co-operative Republic of Guyana was created as the South American nation of Guyana, independent since 1966, commenced a presidential form of government at midnight. Sir Edward Luckhoo, who had been the Governor-General as representative of Queen Elizabeth of the United Kingdom, took office as the first President of Guyana, pending election of a permanent occupant of the ceremonial post. Prime Minister Forbes Burnham, a proponent of the concept of government assistance to cooperatives of employee-owned farms, banks and mining companies, continued as the actual head of government.
- Direct passenger train service from Sydney to Perth was inaugurated.

== February 24, 1970 (Tuesday) ==
- Separate avalanches killed at least 36 people in the European Alps. In Switzerland, snow swept down a mountain into the village of Reckingen, destroying an army barracks and killing 29 people, most of whom were officers in the Swiss Army. The onslaught of the 30 feet of snow decapitated several of the soldiers. A separate avalanche in France struck the Hotel du Gran Signal in the ski resort of Villard-de-Lans, killing at least seven guests.
- Joseph Franklin Sills, a 49-year-old convicted robber in Texas, was sentenced to 1,000 years in prison. A jury in Dallas had recommended the sentence after convicting Sills for the armed robbery of $73.10 from a Dallas dry cleaners, and meted out the punishment after being told that he had 20 prior felony convictions. Other juries in Texas would follow in recommending similarly long imprisonment time, primarily as a protest against Texas law, which allowed convicts to be eligible for parole after 20 years or after one-third of their sentence had been served, whichever came first. Mr. Sills's sentence would be upheld on appeal.
- Born: The Kienast quintuplets, Amy, Sarah, Abigail, Ted and Gordon, in New York City. The Kienast quints were the first in the United States whose mother had used fertility drugs, and only the second set ever to be born in the United States.
- Died: Conrad Nagel, 72, American film, radio and television actor

== February 25, 1970 (Wednesday) ==
- A routine in an episode of the children's TV series Sesame Street was performed for the first time and would soon become a best-selling record, as the muppet character Ernie sang "Rubber Duckie" (with Jim Henson supplying the voice) as an ode to the rubber duck bathtub toy. The latex toy duck had been invented by sculptor Peter Ganine, who applied for a patent on December 29, 1947, and received U.S. Patent No. 153,514 on April 26, 1949. The song itself was written by Jeff Moss and arranged by Joe Raposo.
- After a speech by Attorney William M. Kunstler at the University of California, Santa Barbara (UCSB), a crowd of demonstrators rioted in the Isla Vista section of town near the campus, and burned down a branch of the Bank of America. A 17-year old demonstrator was quoted nationwide, after telling an Associated Press reporter that the crowd attacked the bank branch "because it was there. It was the biggest capitalist establishment thing around."
- Died: Mark Rothko, 66, Latvian-born American abstract expressionist artist, by suicide

== February 26, 1970 (Thursday) ==
- National Public Radio (NPR) was incorporated to be a provider of commercial-free news and programming to American public radio stations. It would first go on the air on April 20, 1971.
- Hey Jude, the second-to-last marketed Beatles album, went on sale worldwide. Along with the title song "Hey Jude" (which had been released as a single 45 RPM record in 1968), the offerings were singles that had never been compiled before on a long playing 33 RPM record album.
- Born: Linda Brava (Linda Lampenius), Finnish classical concert violinist; in Helsinki

== February 27, 1970 (Friday) ==
- The first Women's Liberation Movement (WLM) Conference in British history opened at Ruskin College at Oxford, with about 500 women from 15 groups in the United Kingdom gathering to discuss common goals. From the three-day gathering came demands for equal pay, equal opportunities for education and jobs, free contraception, the right to abortion of a pregnancy, and 24-hour child care

== February 28, 1970 (Saturday) ==
- The Hindu kingdom of Nepal was the scene of the royal wedding of Crown Prince Birendra to his second cousin, Princess Aishwarys Rajya Laskhmi. The ceremonies in Katmandu, which had started the day before, concluded with the marriage to be pronounced at 4:45 in the morning, a time calculated by the royal astrologers based on the horoscopes of the Prince and the Princess Birendra would become King of Nepal in 1972 upon the death of his father, and would reign until June 1, 2001, when he, Queen Aishwarya, and most of the royal family were killed in a murder-suicide carried out by their son, Crown Prince Dipendra.
- Sixty-one of 70 Christian pilgrims from Sri Lanka drowned, when the boat they were on capsized and sank after their departure from Jaffna. The group was on its way to the island of Katchatheevu to celebrate a festival at the shrine of Saint Anthony of Padua.
- The first-ever theft of lunar soil was carried out at the banquet hall of the upscale Bullocks Wilshire store in Los Angeles, where it had been on display for 300 guests attending a fundraising dinner. The 2.3 grams (0.081 oz) sample, part of Moon Rock No. 50 brought back by the Apollo 11 astronauts, was unguarded and the display of the rock had not been authorized by NASA. The lunar sample had been on loan to the UCLA Institute of Geophysics and Planetary Physics since November. The LAPD recovered the purloined vial of dust two days later after receiving an anonymous phone tip that it had been dropped into a mailbox
- Born:
  - Noureddine Morceli, Algerian track athlete, who, between 1994 and 1996 was the fastest man in the world, with the records for fastest 1500, fastest 3000m and fastest mile; in Ténès. In 1993, Morceli became the first person to run a mile in less than 3 minutes and 45 seconds (3:44.39), a mark that stood until 1999
  - Rupert Hamer, British journalist and war correspondent who was killed by a roadside bomb in Afghanistan (d. 2010); in Norwich, East Anglia
- Died: Marie Dionne Houle, 35, one of the four surviving Dionne quintuplets, after a brief illness. In 2019, two of the quintuplets — Annette Allard and Cécile Langlois — would celebrate their 85th birthdays.
