= African socialism =

This map shows the countries that adopted some form of socialism on the African continent at various times from the 1950s to the 1980s.

African socialism is a distinct variant of socialist theory developed in post-colonial Africa during the mid-20th century. As a shared ideology among several African thinkers over the decades, it encompasses a variety of competing interpretations. However, a consistent and defining theme among these theories is the notion that traditional African cultures and community structures have a natural inclination toward socialist principles.

This characterization of socialism as an indigenous African tradition sets African socialism apart as a unique ideological movement, distinctly separate from other socialist movements on the continent or elsewhere in the world. Prominent contributors to this field include Julius Nyerere of Tanzania, Kwame Nkrumah of Ghana, and Léopold Sédar Senghor of Senegal.

== Origins and themes ==
As many African countries gained independence during the 1960s, some of these newly formed governments rejected the ideas of capitalism in favour of a more afrocentric economic model. Leaders of this period professed that they were practising "African socialism".

According to William H. Friedland and Carl G. Rosberg Jr., editors of the book African Socialism, Julius Nyerere in Tanzania, Léopold Senghor in Senegal, Joseph Saidu Momoh and Siaka Stevens in Sierra Leone, Kwame Nkrumah and Hilla Limann inGhana, François Tombalbaye in Chad, Modibo Keïta in Mali, Sékou Touré in Guinea, and Luís Cabral in Guinea-Bissau were the main architects of African Socialism.

Common principles of various versions of African socialism were social development guided by a large public sector, an emphasis on an African identity and the meaning of being African, and the preservation or revival of a classless society. Senghor claimed that "Africa’s social background of tribal community life not only makes socialism natural to Africa but excludes the validity of the theory of class struggle," thus making African socialism, in all of its variations, different from Marxism and European socialist theory.

African socialism became an important model of economic development for countries such as Ghana, Guinea, Senegal and Tanzania. While these countries used different models of African Socialism, many commonalities emerged, such as the desire for political and economic autonomy, self reliance, the Africanisation of business and civil service, Pan-Africanism and non-alignment. Several African countries adopted socialist systems from the 1950s to mid-1980s (~35 out of 50-53 countries at the time).

The first influential publication of socialist thought tailored for application in Africa occurred in 1956 with the release of Senegalese intellectual Abdoulaye Ly's Les masses africaines et l'actuelle condition humaine.

== History and Variants ==
=== Julius Nyerere and Ujamaa ===
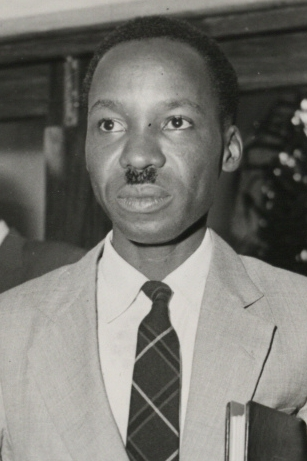
Julius Nyerere

In 1967, President Julius Nyerere of the newly-unified Tanzania issued the Arusha Declaration, committing Tanzania to a socialist reform program. At the center of these reforms was Ujamaa. Ujamaa, meaning "familyhood" in Swahili, was Julius Nyerere's framework for African socialism, intended to integrate traditional communal values with modern ideas of economic and social development.

Though his ideas bear similarities to other forms of socialism in Europe and Asia, Nyerere made it clear through his writings that he saw Ujamaa as distinct from the broader Marxist tradition. Rather than focusing on class struggle, Nyerere imagined the goal of socialism in Tanzania (and Africa generally) to be the restoration of the pre-colonial family unit. As members of a larger familial network, individuals were expected to support each other and share work, lessons that Nyerere believed laid the groundwork for a socialist education. Ujamaa was not meant to replace a failing capitalist system, like socialism was seen in Marxist theory, but to deconstruct the artificial power structures imposed by colonial rule and return to a naturally socialist order. Nyerere argued that in indigenous African culture

Nobody starved, either for food or of human dignity, because he lacked personal wealth; he could depend on the wealth possessed by the community of which he was a member. That was socialism.

Echoing Nyerere, future South African president Nelson Mandela asserted that in the past in Africa

There were no classes, no rich and poor, and no exploitation of man by man. All men were free and equal and this was the foundation of government. Recognition of this general principle found expression in the constitution of the council … in such a society are contained the seed of a revolutionary democracy in which none will be held in slavery or servitude, and in which poverty, want, and insecurity shall be no more.

The ideal society, according to Nyerere, would be built around the core principles of “freedom, equality, and unity”; together, these tenets would create an economy based on cooperative production, foster peaceful community bonds, and encourage democratic political participation. From 1968-1975, Nyerere’s government facilitated the consolidation of rural Tanzania into village-style agricultural communities where resources would be shared collectively. Nyerere, wary of the influence of Western-controlled international economic institutions, claimed that true liberation from colonialism required Tanzania to be economically self-sufficient. These farming villages were to serve as the heart of that development, building Tanzania’s economy while also freeing its culture from the capitalist value and power structure imposed under colonial rule. The theoretical link that Ujamaa created between economic development and social liberation has been praised for being ahead of its time, anticipating a framework that would not become mainstream in Western sociology until the late 20th century.

The general international consensus on the Ujamaa policy regime is that it failed to live up to its goals. Most of the communities created under the Ujamaa program were unable to become self-sufficient in the way Nyerere had imagined. The accelerated timeline of the reforms and bureaucratic inefficiencies led to disappointing economic results. Though the goal of the Ujamaa villagization was to create economic production centers, much of Tanzania’s agricultural production was still done on independently owned small-scale farms that had not been absorbed into the state system. The forced collectivization of farmland that had once been family-owned was a sore point for many farmers, who bristled at the radical cultural and lifestyle changes they were expected to embrace; meanwhile, in cities, the state's focus on agricultural production had inhibited its ability to address socioeconomic class division in urban environments.

Nyerere’s government has also garnered criticism for the manner in which Ujamaa was implemented. At the outset of the program, Ujamaa was to be a voluntary, decentralized effort, leaving a certain degree of autonomy to the individual villages. Over time, however, the state assumed a degree of control over village management and production that some historians have labeled coercive and autocratic, claiming this contradicted the democratic values Ujamaa espoused.

The failure of Ujamaa to deliver on its promises of development and equality led to a wave of intense backlash in the late 1970s-80s. In 1981, the Tanzanian government committed to its “National Economic Survival Programme”, a set of policy changes designed to liberalize the economy. Nyerere stepped down from the Presidency in 1985, but continued to advocate for his model of socialism until his death. By the end of his political tenure, 96% of children had gone to primary school, 50% of them being girls. Female life expectancy had grown from 41 to 50.7 years between 1960 and 1980 and maternal mortality rates dropped from 450 per 100,000 births to under 200 by 1973. Posthumously, Nyerere and Ujamaa have seen a resurgence in popularity in Tanzania.

=== Ubuntu ===
The ancient Ubuntu philosophy of South Africa recognizes the humanity of a person through their interpersonal relationships. The word comes from the Zulu and Xhosa languages. Ubuntu believes in a bond that ties together all of humanity and the fact that a human being is of a high value. According to Archbishop Desmond Tutu, "A man with ubuntu is open and accessible to others, confirming of others, doesn't feel debilitated that others are capable and great, for he or she has a legitimate confidence that originates from realizing that he or she has a place in a more noteworthy entire and is decreased when others are mortified or reduced, when others are tormented or abused."

=== Harambee ===
Harambee is a term that originated among natives, specifically Swahili porters of East Africa; the word harambee traditionally means "let us pull together". It was taken as an opportunity for local Kenyans to self-develop their communities without waiting on government. This helped build a sense of togetherness in the Kenyan community but analysts state that it has brought about class discrepancies because some individuals use this as an opportunity to generate wealth.

=== Kwame Nkrumah and Nkrumahism ===
Nkrumahism was the political philosophy of Ghana's first post-independence president Kwame Nkrumah. As one of the first African political leaders, Nkrumah became a major figure in the left-wing pan-African movement. In his piece A declaration to the colonial peoples, Nkrumah called on Africans to "...affirm the right of all colonial peoples to control their own destiny." and that "All colonies must be free from foreign imperialist control, whether political or economic.". His focus on economic and political freedom would prove to be a fundamental part of his overarching political philosophy, combining the nationalist independence movement in his home country of Ghana along with left-wing economic thought.

A major figure in the Ghanaian independence movement, Nkrumah came to power shortly after Ghana gained its independence in 1957. Once in power, he began a series of infrastructural and economic development plans designed to stimulate the Ghanaian economy. $16 million was designated to be used to build a new town in Tema to be used as an open seaport for Accra and the eastern region of the country. The government designed a new plan to tackle issues surrounding illiteracy and lack of access to education, with thousands of new schools being built in rural areas.

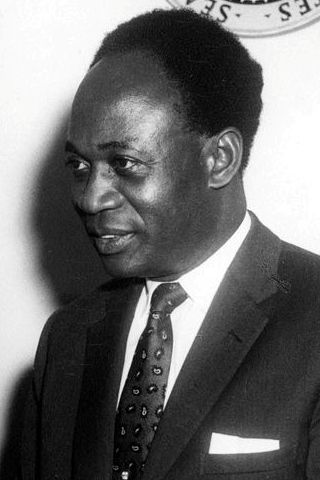
Kwame Nkrumah, the first President of Ghana

Determined to industrialize the country rapidly, Nkrumah set out to modernize Ghana's economy in order to better compete with the West. In turn, his government embarked on a strategy of slowly increasing the amount of government-controlled firms in the country while simultaneously putting restrictions on privately owned companies operating in Ghana. By 1965, the state-controlled 50% of the insurance industry within the country, 60% of all bank deposits were deposited at state-run banks, 17% of the country's sea-bound cargo was handled by state-run firms, 27% of all industrial production was either produced by state-run firms or firms in which the state-controlled a considerable portion and 35% of the country's total imports were handled by the government.

Nkrumah also pushed for Ghana to become an international advocate for the spread of socialism and pan-Africanism throughout the newly independent African states. As the first African colonial state to be granted independence, Ghana became an inspiration to many of the nascent left-wing independence movements throughout the continent. In 1958, Nkrumah helped found the Union of Independent African States, a political union between Ghana, Mali, and Guinea. Though the union was short-lived, the proposed political organization marked the first attempt at regional unity among newly established African republics.

Nkrumah was also instrumental in pushing Ghana towards the major Communist powers, including the USSR and the PRC. In 1961, he made his first official visit to Moscow, receiving an honorary degree from the University of Moscow. In a speech given in Accra in front of a visiting Soviet delegation in 1963, Nkrumah said, "We in Ghana have formally chosen the socialist path and we will build a socialist society... Thus our countries, the Soviet Union and Ghana, will go forward together."

Nkrumah also used the Eastern bloc to expand Ghana's economy by establishing state owned enterprises. In 1962, a Ghanaian newspaper reported that out of the sixty-three foreign agreements signed in 1961, forty-four of the agreements were with East European countries focusing on trade, payments and scientific, technical, and cultural co-operation. There were also five agreements with China and another five with Yugoslavia.

=== Léopold Sédar Senghor and the Socialist Party of Senegal ===
Léopold Senghor was the founder of the Socialist Party of Senegal and the first President of the country. Senghor was not only an important figure in the political development of the country, but also one of the leading figures in the Négritude movement, which informed much of his political thought. Senghor would come to embody a new form of African socialism that rejected many of the traditional Marxist modes of thinking that had developed in post-independence Africa.

Born into an upper-middle-class family, Senghor was able to take advantage of the French educational system that was afforded to many of Africa's educated colonial elite. However, these schools did little to teach African students about their native culture, instead favoring policies of assimilation into mainstream French life. As Senghor once put it the French wanted "bread for all, culture for all, liberty for all; but this liberty, this culture, and this bread will be French." Excelling in his primary education, Senghor enrolled in the University of Paris.

After graduating and serving in the French Army during World War II, Senghor began a career as a poet in Paris, releasing his first book, Chants d'ombre (Shadow Songs) in 1945 and Anthologie de la nouvelle poésie nègre et malagache de langue française (Anthology of the New Black and Malagasy Poetry) in 1948. Both pieces were instrumental in developing the bulk of the emerging Négritude movement, which Senghor hoped would represent the "sum total of the values of the civilization of the African world.".

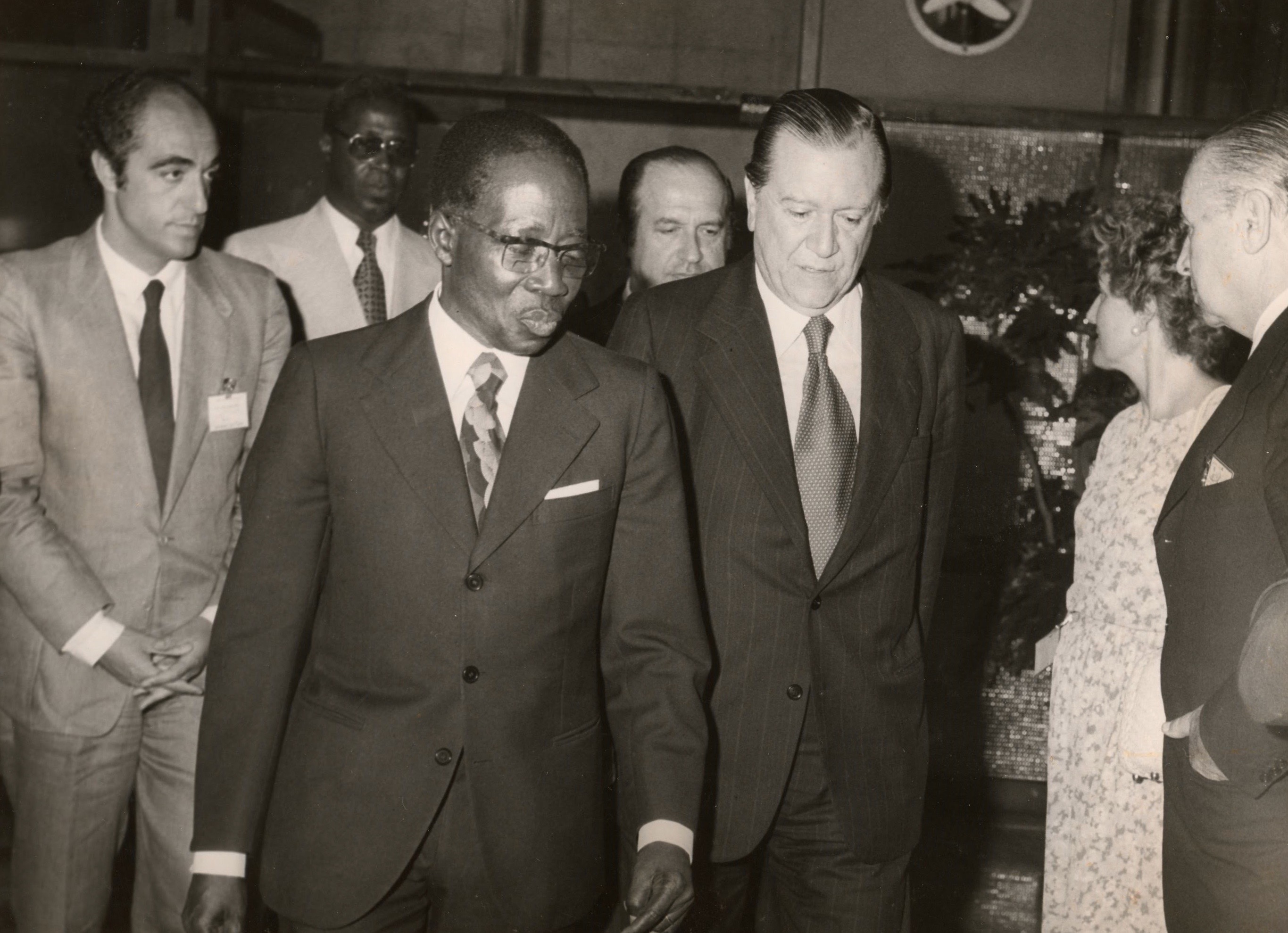
President Senghor meeting with President Rafael Caldera of Venezuela

His work highlighted the vast inequalities in French colonial society and looked at the unique experience of the thousands of Africans living under French rule. In his piece The Challenge of Culture in French West Africa, Senghor called on Africans to "develop a culture based on the strengths of local tradition that was also open to the modern European world".

Senghor was initially not a supporter of an independent Senegal, worrying that the small African country would have little chance as an independent nation. Instead, he advocated for an interconnected relationship similar to that of Paris and France's provinces. In his piece, Vues sure l'Afrique noir, ou s'assimiler non être assimilés (Views on Black Africa, or To Assimilate, Not Be Assimilated), Senghor advocated for popularly elected Senegalese representatives and an executive in Paris, French economic funds to help with Senegalese development, and the inclusion of African cultural and linguistic education in the French educational system.

In 1958, referendums were held in all of the French African colonies on the future of the colonial possessions. The debate was between full on independence and joining the French community, a sort of association of former French colonies that would allow countries like Senegal to become independent, but still maintain an economic and diplomatic relations with the French government. Senghor supported the yes side of the vote and Senegal voted 97% in favor of the association.

When Senegal became a fully independent country in 1960, Senghor was elected to the presidency. After a failed coup led by his Prime Minister in 1962, the Senghor government moved to abolish the post, which was approved by 99% in referendum. The vote substantially strengthened the power of the President, who no longer had to compete with the Prime Minister for executive power.

The Socialist Party compounded its control of Senegalese politics in 1966 when it was declared the country's only legal party, with Senghor as its leader. The one-party system would stay in place until Senghor decided to liberalize the country's election laws by allowing for a 3 party system, with one socialist, one liberal, and one communist party being allowed to contest elections.

As president, Senghor represented a moderated version of African Socialism that didn't align with the more radical interpretations seen in other newly independent African states. Unlike other ex-colonies, Senegal remained closely aligned with the French government. They retained the French Franc as the national currency and Senghor was known to consult the French government before making any major foreign policy decisions. He allowed French advisors and companies to remain in Senegal, including in government and educational posts. When asked about nationalizing French companies, Senghor responded that it would be to "kill the goose that laid the golden egg". His government invested heavily in both education and the public sector, investing 12-15 billion francs and 6 to 9 billion francs in both sectors respectively. He also sought to give more power to the underdeveloped Senegalese countryside, which he did by instituting price protections on peanut crops and allowing for rural representation when making decisions on agricultural policy.

== Women and African socialism ==
African socialism proved to have mixed results for participating women. While some improvements were made from pre-developmental periods in the quality of life for women under African Socialism, setbacks and reflections of past gender hierarchies still persisted.

In Ghana, newfound independence did not create a restructuring of old gender roles. Households were the building blocks of agricultural production and were almost exclusively headed by male workers. Accrued resources were then disproportionately controlled by household heads, under the assumption that subordinate women did not have to do as much work.

However, economic crises in the 1980s saw the women of agricultural households adopt new strategies for reviving local welfare, such as replacing imported products with local goods and migrant male labor with their own. The increased presence of these women in the socialist workforce elevated their position in the community and granted them a say in rural production. Groups of working women began receiving their own plots of land from community leaders, and their contributions became recognized under the rural basis of Ghanaian socialism. Nonetheless, women who were not granted land often had to beg or receive permission from male landowners such as husbands or fathers. Without access to this land, local wives and daughters could not collect wild bush fruits or shea nuts, both crucial to financial welfare.

After the introduction of Ujamaa to Tanzanian life in the late 1960s, strict gender roles became commonplace and were celebrated as a pillar of the nuclear family. Despite efforts of development policy to purge Tanzanian government of European influence, the reinforcement of the nuclear family and assignment of women to the role of domestic house-maker reflected the practice of Christian colonizers before them.

This was likely because newfound independence saw a political focus on stability in the early developmental stages of Tanzania's government. Urban, working-class men unsure of the new government were seen as the greatest threat to national stability, and were provided improved salaries and access to housing, which bolstered their position as household heads, and pushed women further into roles of reproductive labor. Many of the goals surrounding Tanzanian women's rights movements were nonetheless met, including improvements in education, employment, and political opportunities. Regardless, the slow but sure subversion of women's rights movements in Tanzania saw women pushed further back into households, and female governmental leaders deposed for a number of trivial offenses. Still, Tanzanian villagization is recalled positively by many Tanzanian women, as it often provided the opportunity to live closer to kin, and commit to more stable marriage practices. Post WWII, pre-development economy had previously resulted in widespread serial monogamy, or the precarious and temporary marrying and remarrying, which was seen more as a survival strategy than romantic or reproductive endeavor. After resolving the discomfort of villagization, many women found advantage in their placement. For many Tanzanians, the crux of detriment towards women's rights came with the structural adjustment of Ujamaa economic policies in the 1980s.

Across nearly all socialist states in Africa, women's participation in politics did not improve much. In Senegal, policies such as the “Code de la Famille” promised improvements for women's legal protections, but represented a set of laws that women were more subjects to than authors of. In many cases, such reforms were only introduced because of lobbying by wives of well placed politicians. Symbolic representation via educated “femmes phares”, or beacon women, was introduced with the one party system, as well as a set of quotas for women's political participation in the 1980s. Still, both concessions were more a result of male political competition than progressive movements for women's rights. Even those women who were granted public office enjoyed little influence compared to male colleagues of similar position. These developments reflected the predicament faced by eastern European women who received positions in symbolic organs of communist puppet-states. Real political power seemed to flow from the “inner circle” of such states. Power which was visible to the public in African nations was typically held by heads of state who were able to dominate and retain their position in a political monopoly.

African conferences for national liberation and socialism saw great participation from feminist organizations, but very little attention given to feminist issues. Nonetheless, developments were made with the unity of eastern feminist groups, but discourse with their western counterparts. With socialism and anti-colonialism at the forefront of African feminist issues, the question of how male leaders would make economic development benefit all members of a household was paramount, but one that was not taken seriously in conferences. Instead, feminist organizations were forced to drive international change on their own, often starting with the double standards and hypocrisies that could be found in their relations with other feminist groups. While feminists in Egypt were criticized for undemocratic practices in their developing government, countries like Britain seemed to escape scrutiny for its imperialist tendencies and improper treatment of its territories.

== Relations to the Soviet Union ==
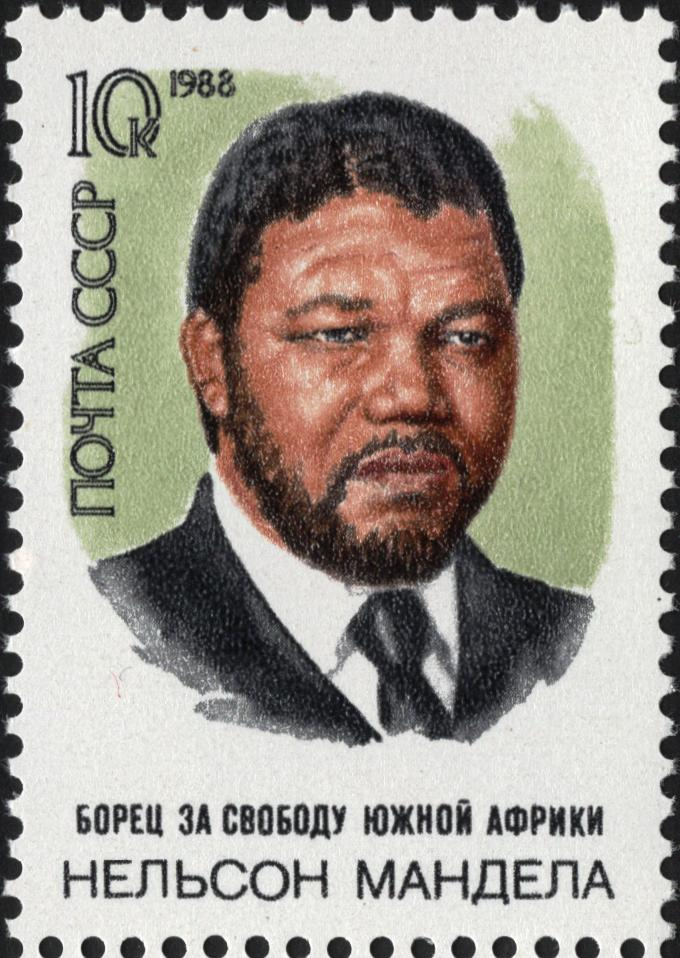
1988 Soviet commemorative stamp, captioned "Fighter for the freedom of South Africa Nelson Mandela" in Russian

In the early 1960s, at the height of the Cold War, Soviet Union based Africanists grappled with the concept of African Socialism and its legitimacy within the Marxist–Leninist theory. Leading Soviet Africanist, Professor Ivan Potekhin argued that African Socialism could not exist because there could be no varieties of true Marxist–Leninist socialism. There was not a single perspective on whether socialism existed in Africa. It was believed that Africa could have its unique road to socialism, but not its own form of it.

Soviet African Specialists recognized countries such as Guinea, Mali, and Ghana as closer to true Marxist–Leninist socialism. Ahmed Sékou Touré (1961), Modibo Keïta (1963) and Kwame Nkrumah (1962) were honored with Lenin Peace Prizes. Countries such as Senegal and Côte d'Ivoire were considered ‘reactionary’ and prone to collaboration with the imperialist powers.

Policies that were generally viewed as favourable by the Soviets were: economic independence, the creation of a national monetary system, a strong state sector economy, a state bank, state control over exports and transports, mutual assistance programs and common land ownership.

African Socialists argued in favor of a distinctive form of socialism because they believed that socialism had its roots in pre-colonial African society. According to them, African society was a classless society, characterized by a communal spirit and democracy on the basis of government through discussion and consensus. The main objective was to unite African people in this image of the traditional pre-colonial society.

Soviet Africanists did not agree that African society had a traditional classless society.

== See also ==
- Third Worldism
- Pan-Africanism
- Anarchism in Africa
- Socialism with Chinese characteristics
- Arab socialism
- Melanesian socialism
- Ubuntu
- Uhuru Movement
- Ujamaa
- Harambee
- Third International Theory
- Sankarism
