= Liberty Corner, New Jersey =

Populated place in Somerset County, New Jersey, US

- Census-designated place
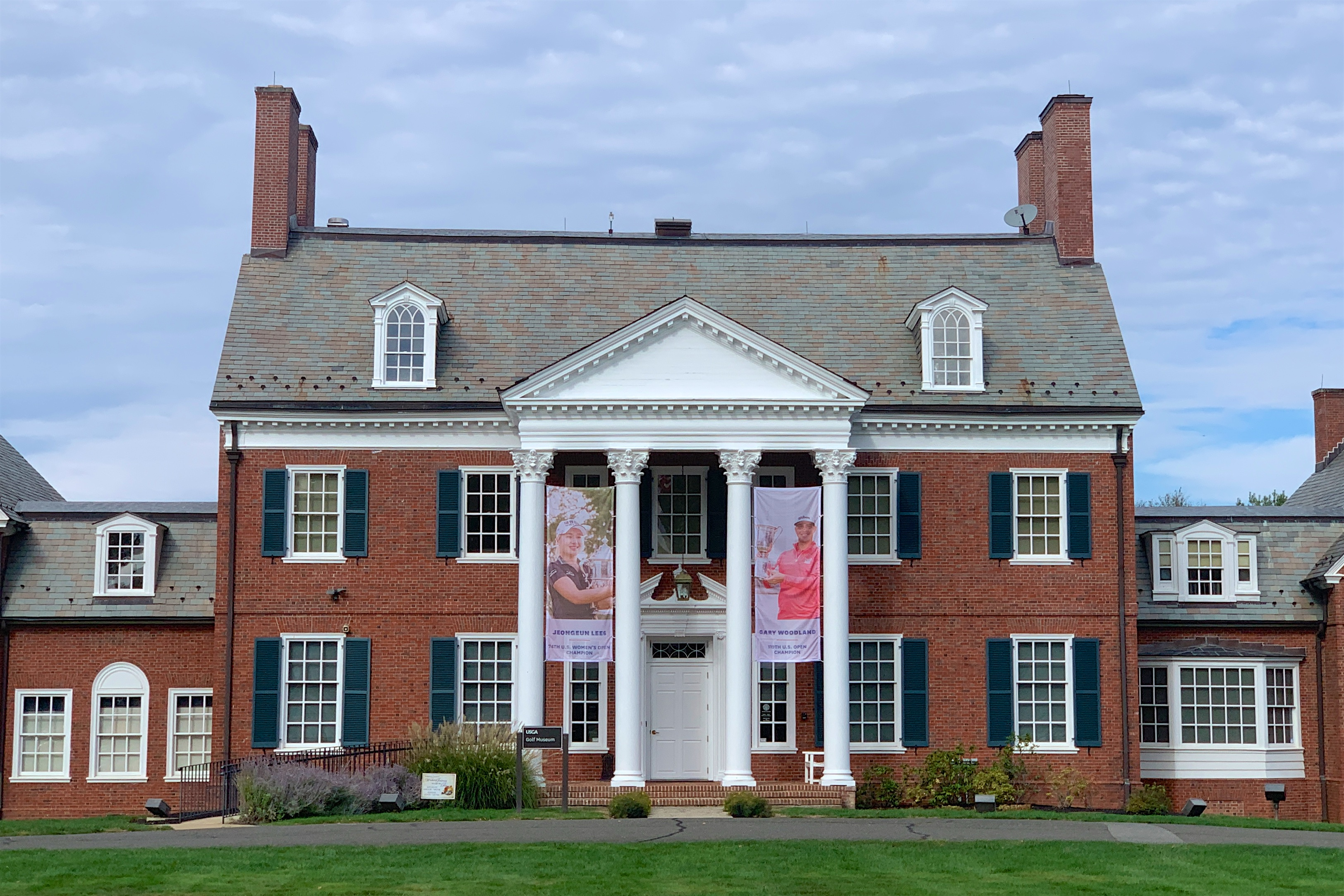
- USGA Museum

- Location in Somerset County Location in New Jersey Location in the United States
- Coordinates: 40°39′53″N 074°34′39″W
- Country: United States
- State: New Jersey
- County: Somerset
- Township: Bernards

Area
  - Total: 1.93 sq mi (5.00 km^{2})
  - Land: 1.92 sq mi (4.98 km^{2})
  - Water: 0.0077 sq mi (0.02 km^{2})
- Elevation: 236 ft (72 m)

Population (2020)
  - Total: 1,877
  - Density: 980/sq mi (377/km^{2})
- Time zone: UTC−05:00 (Eastern (EST))
  - Summer (DST): UTC−04:00 (EDT)
- ZIP Code: 07938
- Area code: 908
- FIPS code: 34-40140
- GNIS feature ID: 877746

Liberty Corner is an unincorporated community and census-designated place (CDP) located in Bernards Township, in Somerset County, in the U.S. state of New Jersey. As of the 2020 census, Liberty Corner had a population of 1,877. Liberty Corner is about 3 3/4 miles (6.0 km) south of Bernardsville. Liberty Corner has a post office with ZIP code 07938. The Liberty Corner Historic District was listed on the state and national registers of historic places in 1991.

== Demographics ==
Historical population
Census	Pop.	Note	%±
2020	1,877		—
U.S. Decennial Census; 2020

Liberty Corner was first listed as a census designated place in the 2020 U.S. census.

Liberty Corner CDP, New Jersey – Racial and ethnic composition Note: the US Census treats Hispanic/Latino as an ethnic category. This table excludes Latinos from the racial categories and assigns them to a separate category. Hispanics/Latinos may be of any race.
Race / Ethnicity (NH = Non-Hispanic)	Pop 2020	2020
White alone (NH)	1,434	76.40%
Black or African American alone (NH)	11	0.59%
Native American or Alaska Native alone (NH)	0	0.00%
Asian alone (NH)	244	13.00%
Native Hawaiian or Pacific Islander alone (NH)	1	0.05%
Other race alone (NH)	6	0.32%
Mixed race or Multiracial (NH)	79	4.21%
Hispanic or Latino (any race)	102	5.43%
Total	1,877	100.00%

As of 2020, the population was 1,877.

== History ==
In 1722, the area was known by its primary landholder, John Annin, as "Annin's Corner." This was changed to "Liberty Corner" during the American Revolution.

On August 29, 1781, the First Brigade of the French Army, the Expédition Particulière, under command of the French general Comte de Rochambeau, camped here by Bullion's Tavern, along the route to Yorktown, Virginia. The next day they marched to the campground at Somerset Courthouse, now Millstone. The American Continental Army marched nearby along different roads as part of this joint effort.

The Bonnie Brae School for boys was an orphanage in the area. It was founded in 1916 as a "working farm" for boys. in 2018 it accepts boys that have been emotionally maltreated.

== Historic district ==
- Liberty Corner Historic District
- U.S. National Register of Historic Places
- U.S. Historic district
- New Jersey Register of Historic Places
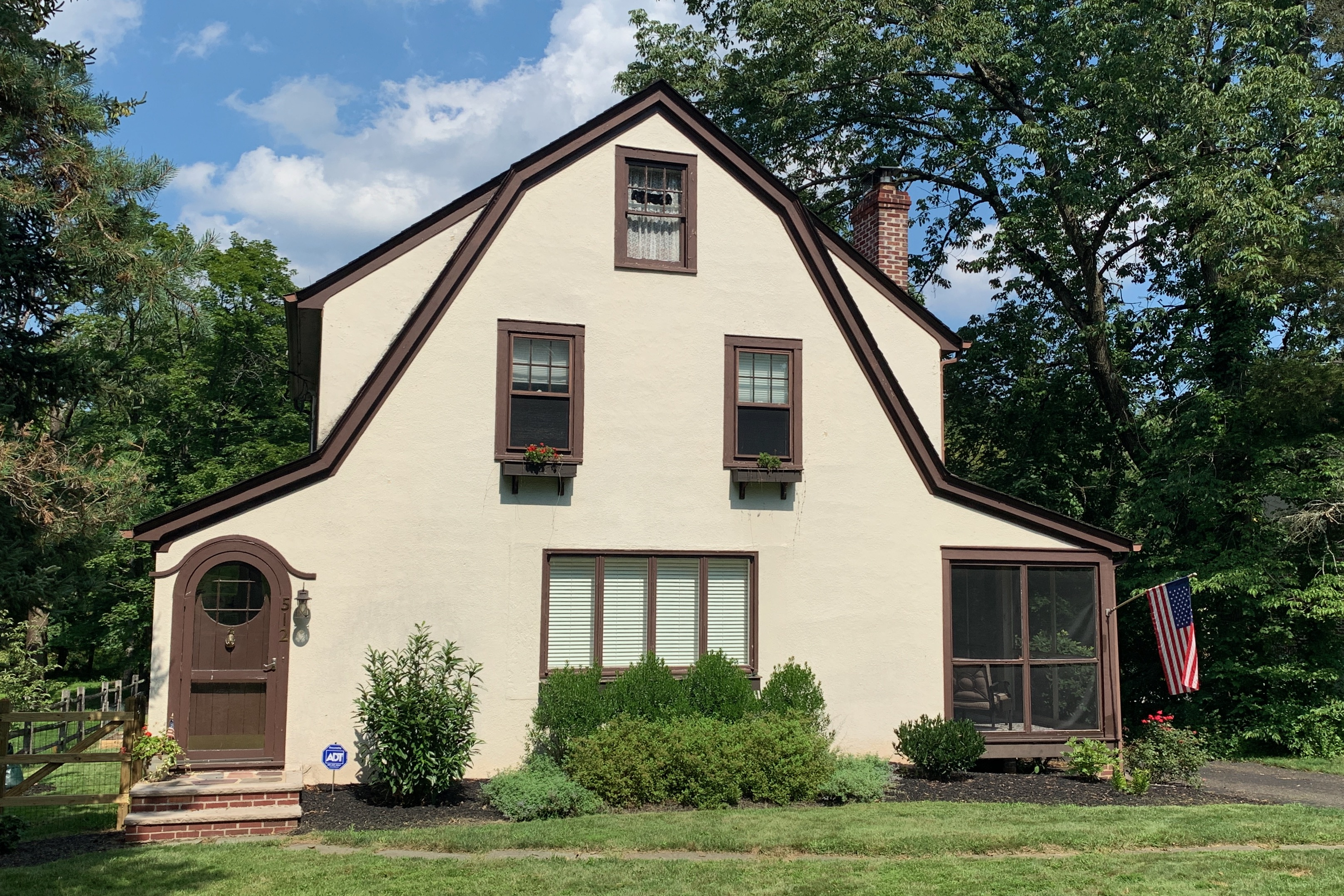
- Eclectic Revival style house
- Location: Roughly, junction of Church Street and Valley and Lyons Roads, and area West and Southwest
- Area: 142.3 acres (57.6 ha)
- Built: 1869
- Built by: James A. Goltra
- Architectural style: Colonial Revival, Italianate, Queen Anne
- NRHP reference No.: 91001477
- NJRHP No.: 2473

Significant dates
- Added to NRHP: October 11, 1991
- Designated NJRHP: August 16, 1991

The Liberty Corner Historic District is a historic district in the village. The district was added to the National Register of Historic Places on October 11, 1991, for its significance in community development and architecture from 1865 to 1935.

== Education ==
Liberty Corner Elementary, built in c. 1904, is located in the area. It is the oldest school in the Bernards Township School District. It once instructed grades 1 through 8. In 2018, it taught 550 students in grades K-5.

== Points of interest ==
- The United States Golf Association and the USGA Museum

== Gallery ==
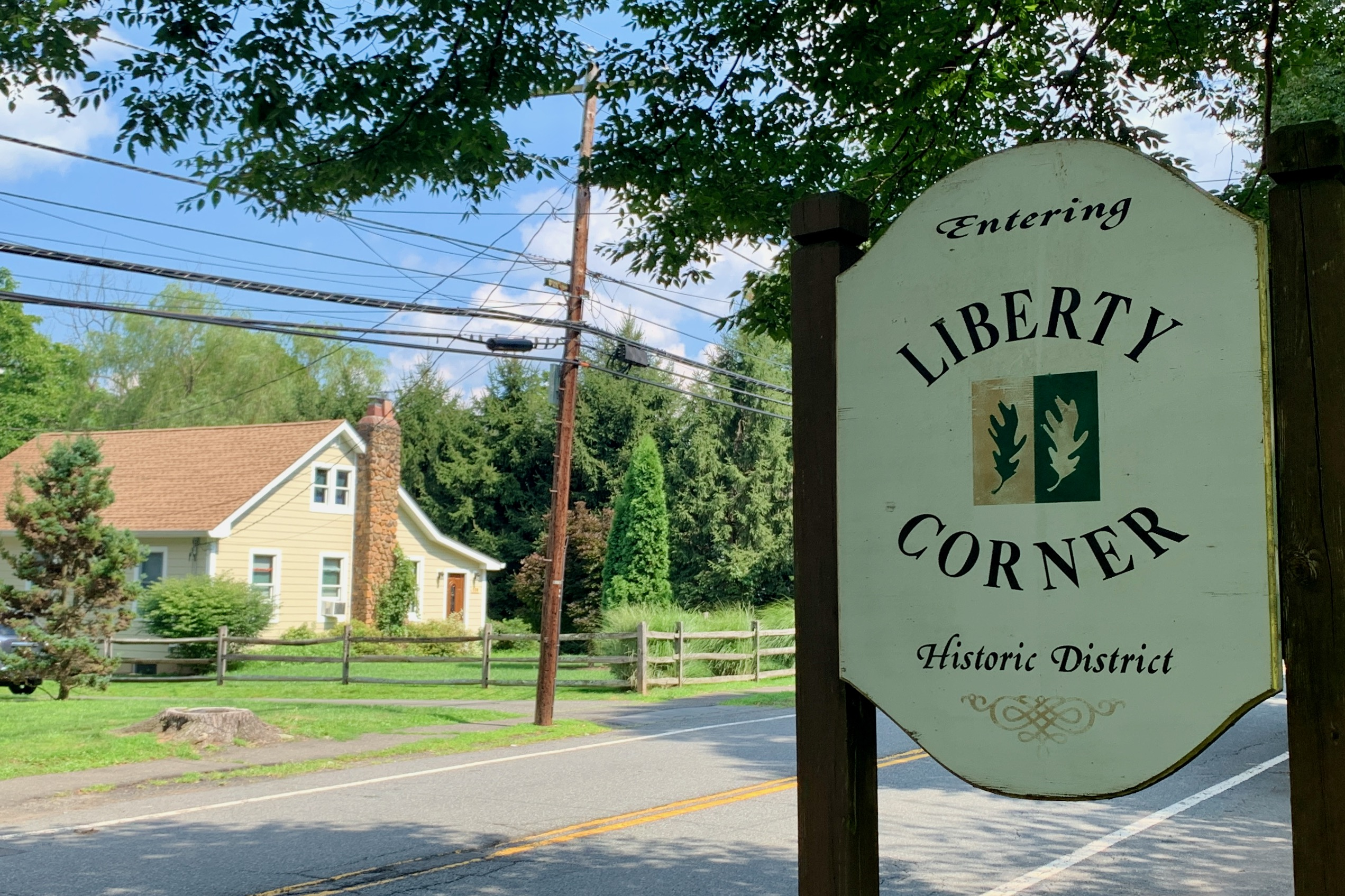
Historic district

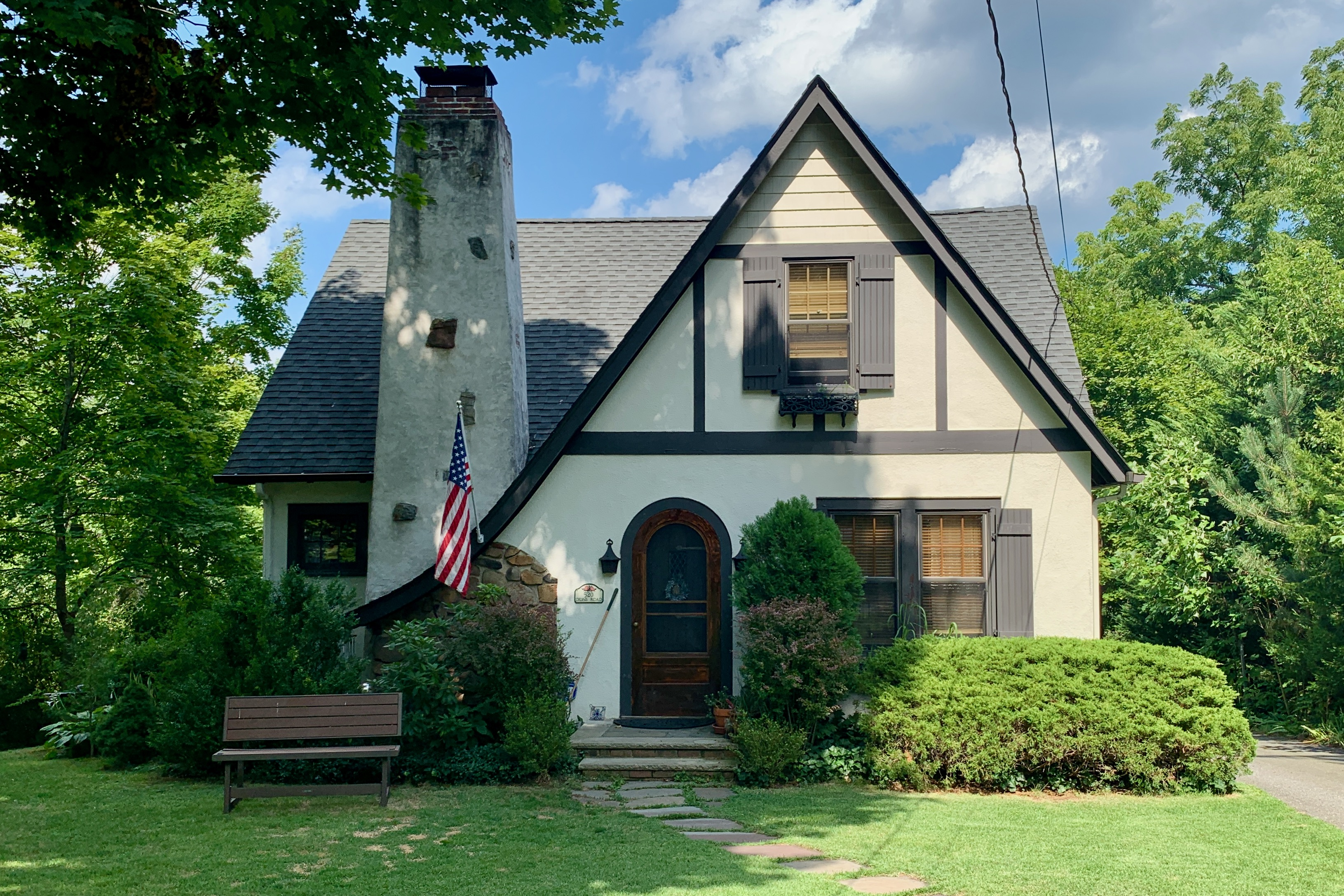
Eclectic Revival style house

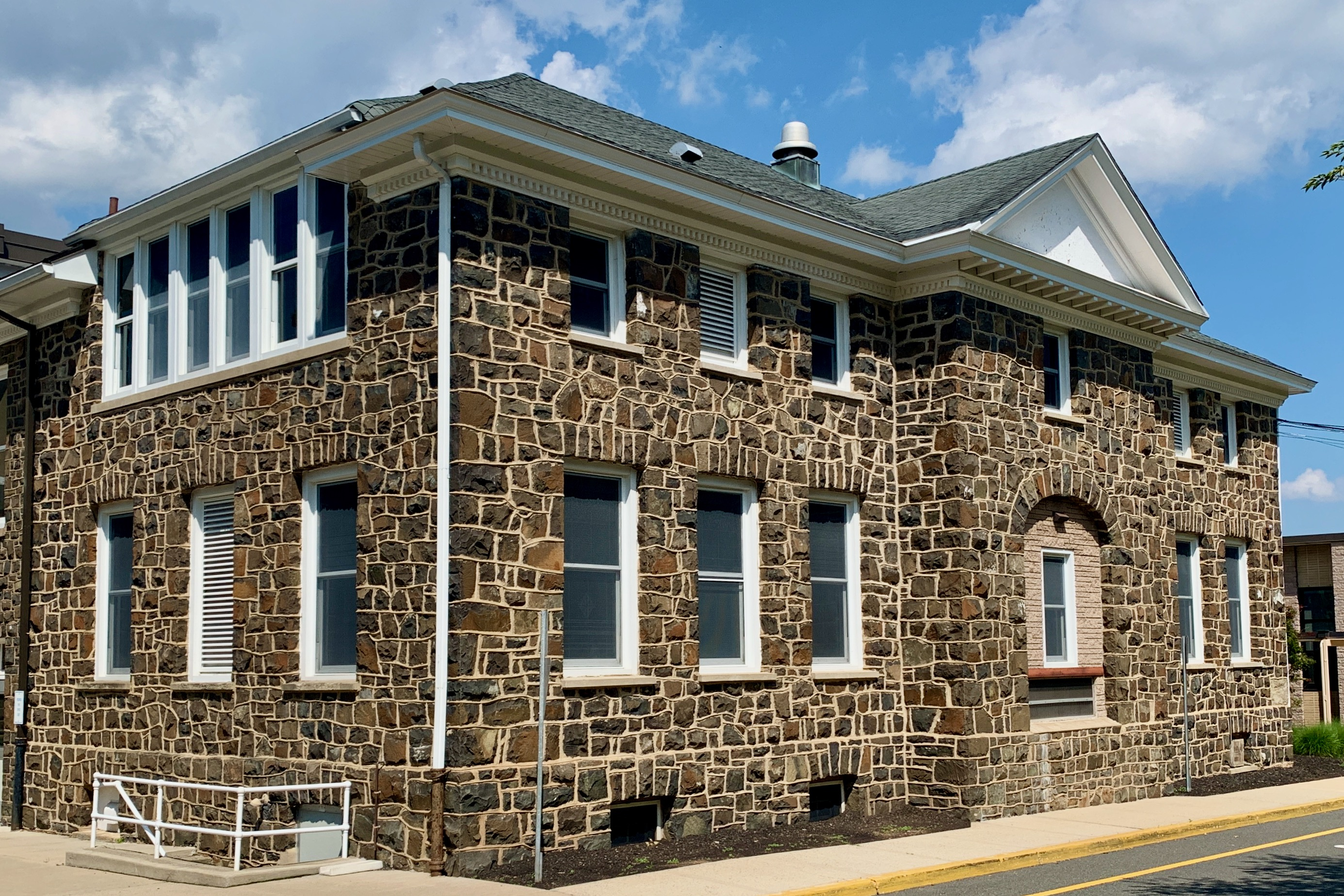
Liberty Corner Elementary School

== Notable people ==
People who were born in, residents of, or otherwise closely associated with Liberty Corner include:

- The Kienast quintuplets (born 1970), lived here from just after their birth in 1970 to at least 1984
- William Henry Johnson, known as Zip the Pinhead was born here sometime before 1858.
