= 1970 Senegalese prime ministerial referendum =

- 22 February 1970

Results
Choice	Votes	%
Yes	1,261,580	99.96%
No	542	0.04%
Valid votes	1,262,122	99.66%
Invalid or blank votes	4,259	0.34%
Total votes	1,266,381	100.00%
Registered voters/turnout	1,329,701	95.24%

A referendum on reinstating the post of Prime Minister was held in Senegal on 22 February 1970, after the post had been abolished in a referendum in 1963. The result was 99.96% of voters in favour of the change, with a 95.2% turnout. Following the referendum, Abdou Diouf was appointed to the post on 26 February.

== Results ==
Choice	Votes	%
For	1,261,580	99.96
Against	542	0.04
Total	1,262,122	100.00
Valid votes	1,262,122	99.66
Invalid/blank votes	4,259	0.34
Total votes	1,266,381	100.00
Registered voters/turnout	1,329,701	95.24
Source: Direct Democracy
