= Stock Exchange Luncheon Club =

Former dining club at the New York Stock Exchange

- Interactive map of Stock Exchange Luncheon Club

Restaurant information
- Established: 1898
- Closed: 2006
- Location: 11 Wall Street, New York, New York, 10005, United States
- Coordinates: 40°42′24″N 74°00′41″W

The Stock Exchange Luncheon Club was a members-only dining club, on the seventh floor of the New York Stock Exchange Building at 11 Wall Street in Manhattan. The club was founded on August 3, 1898, and moved from 70 Broadway to 11 Wall Street when the New York Stock Exchange (NYSE) opened its new building in 1903. It closed on April 28, 2006, after more than a century of service.

The club had an inaugural membership of 200, with a "long waiting list", when it first opened as the Luncheon Club at 70 Broadway and 15 New Street, Manhattan.

Joseph L. Searles III, who became the first African American member of the NYSE when he joined in 1970, said that his "biggest fear...was where would I sit in the luncheon club?". The situation was resolved when Searles was given his own table by the club, and he dined alone for a while.

A ladies' restroom was installed in the club as late as 1987, some twenty years after women were first admitted to the NYSE.

In 1999, the club had more than 1,400 members, and was lavishly decorated with various animal heads, most shot by members on safari.

In August 2001, the Stock Exchange Luncheon Club served as the venue for the presentation of custom-made motorized wheelchairs to 17 quadraplegic in-patients of a local hospital for paralyzed people. A fund-raising event was held by the New York City Police Foundation at the club in November 2003. Following security measures put in place at the NYSE, after the September 11 attacks, the club became less accessible, and this, coupled with the ousting of regular patron Richard Grasso from the head of the NYSE, and a decline in similar local dining clubs, was cited as a factor in the club's demise when it closed in 2006. The space continued to be used for important events for example, the NYSE shareholder vote to merge with Euronext on December 19, 2006.

== See also ==
- List of restaurants in New York City
- New York Stock Exchange
