= William H. Friedland =

American sociologist (1923–2018)

William Herbert Friedland (May 27, 1923 – February 20, 2018) was an American sociologist.

Friedland was of Russian Jewish descent and grew up in Staten Island. After attending Wagner College, he moved to Detroit and worked at automobile factories for a decade, namely for the Hudson Motor Car Company and Ford Motor Company. Allied with Max Shachtman's third camp, Friedland was also active as a labor organizer for the United Auto Workers and Congress of Industrial Organizations. He was introduced to Joe Glazer by Bill Kemsley. Friedland and Glazer recorded songs of the labor movement, releasing two albums together. Friedland left his factory job and returned to academia, earning a bachelor's degree from Wayne State University and a doctorate at University of California, Berkeley. He then taught at Cornell University, where he established the Migrant Labor Project, which introduced undergraduate students to field study practices used at the graduate level. Friedland joined the faculty of the University of California, Santa Cruz in 1969, and founded the school's community studies department. As dean of UCSC's Social Sciences Division, Friedland helped establish College Eight. He died in Santa Cruz, California at the age of 94 on February 20, 2018.
