= Joseph L. Searles III =

American stockbroker

Joseph Louis Searles III (January 2, 1942 – July 26, 2021) was the first black floor member and floor broker in the New York Stock Exchange.

Searles was born in Asheville, North Carolina. He graduated and played football at Kansas State University, then played professionally for the New York Giants. He subsequently became an aide to New York mayor John Lindsay. He was a member of the Stock Exchange Luncheon Club and the New York Young Republican Club. He worked as a floor partner in the firm of Neuberger, Loeb and Company. In February 1970, he became the first black member of the NYSE. He later earned a law degree from Georgetown University.
