= Kienast quintuplets =

Set of quintuplets born in New York City in 1970

Kienast Quintuplets
- Born: February 24, 1970 (age 56); New York City, U.S.

The Kienast quintuplets (born February 24, 1970), are a set of quintuplets born to William "Bill" and Peggy Jo Kienast in New York City, United States. They are;

- Amy
- Sara
- Abigail
- Edward (Ted)
- William (Gordon)

== Biography ==
The quintuplets were the first American set of surviving quintuplets to be conceived through the use of fertility drugs. They were born to parents who had previously conceived two other children through by using the fertility drug Pergonal. They were only the second set of surviving quintuplets born in the U.S. so news of their birth at Columbia-Presbyterian Medical Center in New York City made international headlines. They were brought home to Liberty Corner, New Jersey, on April 27, 1970, two months after they were born. As babies and toddlers they were featured on numerous talk shows and commercials and Good Housekeeping magazine had an exclusive deal to publish four articles about them in their first two years.

Despite the commercials the family began having financial problems. Bill Kienast had struggled in establishing two businesses, and in 1983 the family would have had their home foreclosed upon if not for the intervention of a local industrialist. In 1984, Bill Kienast committed suicide by carbon monoxide inhalation, which made national headlines.

In May 2001, the quintuplets, then 31, and their mother gave an interview to Good Housekeeping, their last known national media appearance.

In 2020, the family was interviewed for their local newspaper on the occasion of their 50th birthdays. All were doing well.
