= 1963 Senegalese prime ministerial referendum =

- 3 March 1963

Results
Choice	Votes	%
Yes	1,155,077	99.45%
No	6,349	0.55%
Valid votes	1,161,426	99.95%
Invalid or blank votes	634	0.05%
Total votes	1,162,060	100.00%
Registered voters/turnout	1,232,479	94.29%

A referendum on abolishing the post of Prime Minister was held in Senegal on 3 March 1963. The result was 99% of voters in favour of the change, with a 94% turnout.

== Results ==
Choice	Votes	%
For	1,155,077	99.45
Against	6,349	0.55
Total	1,161,426	100.00
Valid votes	1,161,426	99.95
Invalid/blank votes	634	0.05
Total votes	1,162,060	100.00
Registered voters/turnout	1,232,479	94.29
Source: Direct Democracy
