= Brockton VA Medical Center =

Brockton VA Medical CenterBrockton VA Medical Center
- VA Boston Healthcare System

Geography
- Location: Brockton, Massachusetts, United States

Links
- Lists: Hospitals in Massachusetts
- Brockton VA Hospital Historic District
- U.S. National Register of Historic Places
- U.S. Historic district
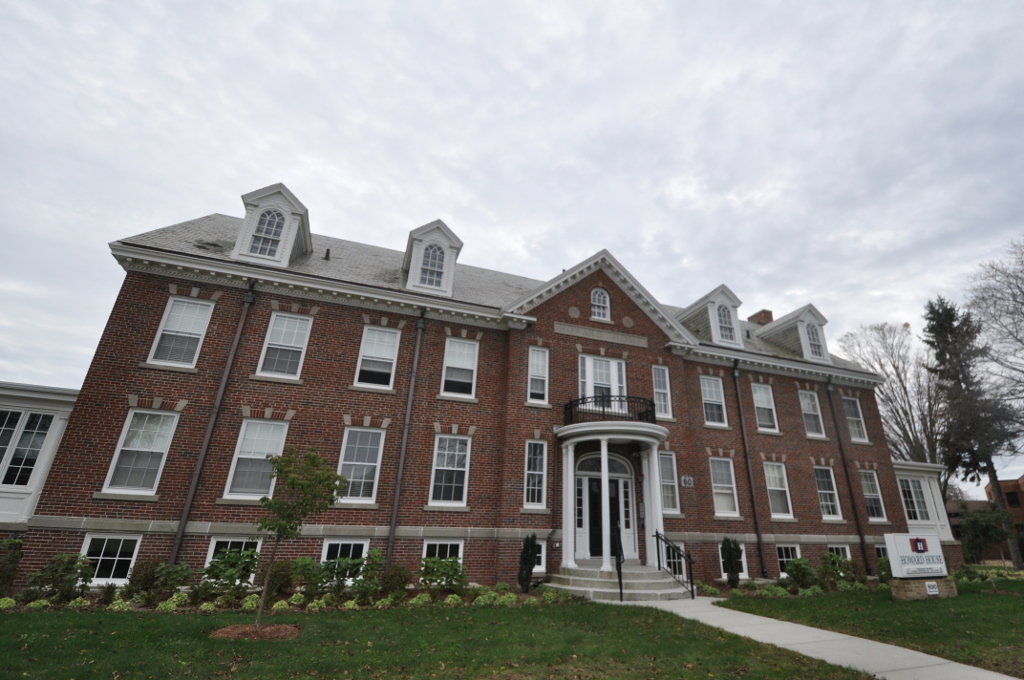
- Building 60

- Location within Massachusetts Location within the United States
- Location: 940 Belmont St., Brockton, Massachusetts
- Coordinates: 42°3′49″N 71°3′16″W
- Built: 1953
- NRHP reference No.: 100008004
- Added to NRHP: August 12, 2022

The Brockton Veterans Affairs Medical Center, is a medical facility of the United States Department of Veterans Affairs (VA) at 940 Belmont Street in Brockton, Massachusetts. Established in 1953, it is now a satellite location of the VA Boston Healthcare System, providing a variety of comprehensive and specialized care services. The campus was listed on the National Register of Historic Places in 2022 as the Brockton VA Hospital Historic District.

== History ==
Brockton was proposed as a site for a VA facility as early as the late 1930s, but it was not until 1949 that funding was appropriated for this facility, as part of a post-World War II expansion of services for military veterans. Ground was broken in 1950, and the hospital opened in 1953 on land purchased by the city and given to the federal government. Included on this property was the Howard Home for Aged Men, an elder care facility established in 1924. At the time of its completion it was the largest and most expensive VA facility in the country, and it became one of the city's major employers.

Originally developed as a psychiatric hospital, it was expanded to provide a variety of other services. In 1986 it was merged administratively with the West Brockton VA, and in 1999 it became part of the VA Boston Healthcare System.

== Campus ==
The Brockton VA campus is located southwest of downtown Brockton, on more than 140 acres (57 ha) south of Belmont Street between Massachusetts Route 24 and Brockton High School. It has more than 20 buildings arranged on a network of internal roads, most of which date to the first decade of the hospital's operation. The layout of the buildings follows the principles of Beaux Arts design, with a cluster of large central buildings arrayed at the end of a central drive, and lower-profile ancillary and support buildings extending outward from the core.

== See also ==
- Northampton Veterans Affairs Medical Center
- Bedford Veterans Affairs Medical Center
- National Register of Historic Places listings in Plymouth County, Massachusetts
- List of Veterans Affairs medical facilities
