= List of Veterans Affairs medical facilities =

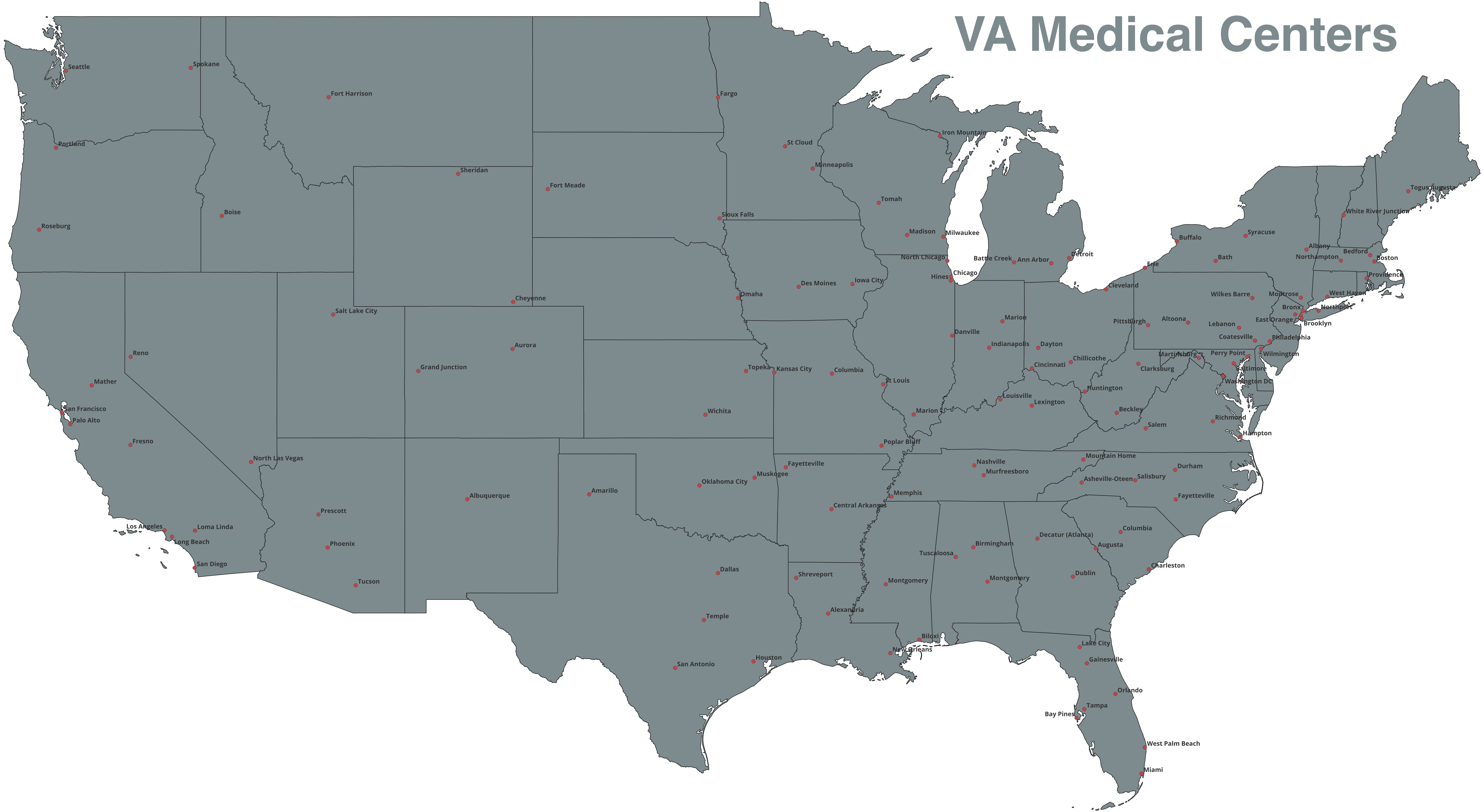
Showing 131 VA Medical Centers in the Contiguous United States

Veterans' health care in the United States is separated geographically into 19 regions (numbered 1, 2, 4–10, 12 and 15–23) known as VISNs, or Veterans Integrated Service Networks, into systems within each network headed by medical centers, and hierarchically within each system by division level of care or type. This article lists VA VISN facilities by region, location, and type.

Seal of the US Department of Veterans Affairs

VA medical facilities and Vet Centers are run by the Veterans Health Administration of the United States Department of Veterans Affairs. Vet Centers focus on post-war adjustment, counseling and outreach services for veterans and their families. There are currently 170 VA Medical Centers and approximately 1,193 community-based outpatient clinics in the US. Facilities types (level of care types) are listed in the VISN tables below as:

- Network System Headquarters (HQ)
- Network Health Care System (HCS)
- VA Medical Centers (VAMC)
- VA Health Care Centers (HCC)
- Division (Inpatient/Outpatient) (DIVIO)
- Domiciliary Care (DOM)
- Outpatient Clinic (OPC)
- Veterans Affairs Clinic (VAC) [formerly Community Based Outpatient Clinic (CBOC)]
- VA Independent Outpatient Clinic (IOC)
- VA/DoD Joint Venture Site (VADOD)
- Vet Center (VC)
- Mobile Vet Center (MVC)
- VA Outreach Clinic (ORC)
- VA Rehabilitation Center (REHAB)
- Community Service Program (CSP)
- Other Outpatient Services Site (OSS)

== VISNs 1 through 23 ==
=== VISN Regions ===
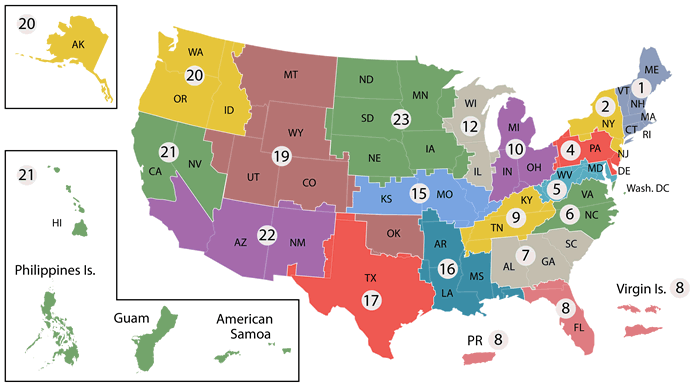
Map showing each VISN, by color

VISN	Network name	Region served
VISN1	VA New England Health Care System	Connecticut, Maine, Massachusetts, New Hampshire, Rhode Island, Vermont
VISN2	VA Healthcare New York/New Jersey	New York, New Jersey
VISN4	VISN4 network (PA, DE, NJ, OH)	Delaware, New Jersey, Ohio, Pennsylvania
VISN5	VA Capitol Healthcare Network	Maryland, Virginia, Washington, D.C., West Virginia
VISN6	VA Mid-Atlantic Health Care Network	North Carolina, Virginia (The Beckley, WV VA facility has been re-aligned with VISN 5)
VISN7	VA Southeast Network	Alabama, Georgia, South Carolina
VISN8	VA Sunshine Healthcare Network	Florida, Puerto Rico, US Virgin Islands
VISN9	VA MidSouth Healthcare Network	Kentucky, Tennessee (The Clarksburg, WV VA facility has been re-aligned with VISN 5)
VISN10	VA Healthcare System	Indiana, Kentucky, Ohio, Michigan, Illinois
VISN12	VA Great Lakes Healthcare System	Illinois, Indiana, Michigan, Wisconsin
VISN15	VA Heartland Network	Illinois, Kansas, Missouri
VISN16	South Central VA Healthcare Network	Arkansas, Louisiana, Mississippi, Texas
VISN17	VA Heart of Texas Healthcare System	Texas
VISN18	VA Southwest Healthcare Network	Arizona, New Mexico, Texas
VISN19	VA Rocky Mountain Network	Colorado, Montana, Utah, Wyoming, Oklahoma
VISN20	VA Northwest Health Network	Alaska, Idaho, Montana, Oregon, Washington state
VISN21	VA Sierra Pacific Network	Northern California, Nevada, American Samoa, Guam, Hawaii, Pacific islands, Philippines
VISN22	VA Desert Pacific Healthcare Network	Southern California, Nevada
VISN23	VA Midwest Healthcare Network	Illinois, Iowa, Minnesota, Nebraska, North Dakota, South Dakota

=== VISN 1: VA New England Healthcare System ===
Headquarters: Bedford, Massachusetts

Facility	City	State	Type
Edith Nourse Rogers Memorial Veterans Hospital	Bedford	MA	VAMC
Manchester VA Medical Center	Manchester	NH	VAMC
VA Central Western Massachusetts Healthcare System	Leeds	MA	VAMC
Providence VA Healthcare System	Providence	RI	VAMC
Togus VA Medical Center	Augusta	ME	VAMC
VA Boston Healthcare System, Brockton Campus	Brockton	MA	VAMC
VA Boston Healthcare System, Jamaica Plain Campus	Jamaica Plain	MA	VAMC
VA Boston Healthcare System, West Roxbury Campus	West Roxbury	MA	VAMC
VA Connecticut Healthcare System	Newington	CT	VAMC
VA Connecticut Healthcare System	West Haven	CT	VAMC
White River Junction VA Medical Center	White River Junction	VT	VAMC
Houlton Satellite Clinic	Houlton	ME	IOC
Portland Mental Health Clinic	Portland	ME	IOC
Aroostook County (Caribou) Community Based Outpatient Clinic	Caribou	ME	CBOC
Bangor Community Based Outpatient Clinic	Bangor	ME	CBOC
Bennington Outpatient Clinic	Bennington	VT	CBOC
Boston Outpatient Clinic	Boston	MA	CBOC
Calais Outpatient Clinic	Calais	ME	CBOC
Conway Outpatient Clinic	Conway	NH	CBOC
Danbury Outpatient Clinic	Danbury	CT	CBOC
Dorchester Outpatient Clinic	Dorchester	MA	CBOC
Fitchburg Outpatient Clinic	Fitchburg	MA	CBOC
Framingham Outpatient Clinic	Framingham	MA	CBOC
Gloucester Outpatient Clinic	Gloucester	MA	CBOC
Greenfield Outpatient Clinic	Greenfield	MA	CBOC
Haverhill Outpatient Clinic	Haverhill	MA	CBOC
Hyannis Outpatient Clinic	Hyannis	MA	CBOC
John J. McGuirk (New London) VA Outpatient Clinic	New London	CT	CBOC
Lincoln Community Based Outpatient Clinic	Lincoln	ME	CBOC
Littleton Community Based Outpatient Clinic	Littleton	NH	CBOC
Lowell Outpatient Clinic	Lowell	MA	CBOC
Martha's Vineyard Outpatient Clinic	Martha's Vineyard	MA	CBOC
Middletown Outpatient Clinic	Middletown	RI	CBOC
Nantucket Outpatient Clinic	Nantucket	MA	CBOC
New Bedford Outpatient Clinic	New Bedford	MA	CBOC
North Shore Outpatient Clinic	Lynn	MA	CBOC
Pittsfield Outpatient Clinic	Pittsfield	MA	CBOC
Portsmouth Outpatient Clinic	Portsmouth	NH	CBOC
Quincy Outpatient Clinic	Quincy	MA	CBOC
Rumford Community Based Outpatient Clinic	Rumford	ME	CBOC
Rutland Community Based Outpatient Clinic	Rutland	VT	CBOC
Saco Community Based Outpatient Clinic	Saco	ME	CBOC
Somersworth Outpatient Clinic	Somersworth	NH	CBOC
Springfield Outpatient Clinic and Community Care Center	Springfield	MA	CBOC
Stamford Outpatient Clinic	Stamford	CT	CBOC
Tilton Outpatient Clinic	Tilton	NH	CBOC
Colchester Community Based Outpatient Clinic (Fort Ethan Allen)	Colchester	VT	CBOC
Waterbury Outpatient Clinic	Waterbury	CT	CBOC
Windham Outpatient Clinic	Willimantic	CT	CBOC
Winsted Outpatient Clinic	Winsted	CT	CBOC
Worcester Outpatient Clinic	Worcester	MA	CBOC
1A Northeast Regional Office	Auburn	NH	VC
Bangor Vet Center	Bangor	ME	VC
Berlin Vet Center	Gorham	NH	VC
Boston Vet Center	Boston	MA	VC
Brockton Vet Center	Brockton	MA	VC
Caribou Vet Center	Caribou	ME	VC
Hartford Vet Center	Rocky Hill	CT	VC
Hyannis Vet Center	Hyannis	MA	VC
Lewiston Vet Center	Lewiston	ME	VC
Lowell Vet Center	Lowell	MA	VC
Manchester Vet Center	Manchester	NH	VC
New Bedford Vet Center	Fairhaven	MA	VC
New Haven Vet Center	West Haven	CT	VC
Norwich Vet Center	Norwich	CT	VC
Portland Vet Center	Portland	ME	VC
Providence Vet Center	Warwick	RI	VC
Sanford Vet Center	Springvale	ME	VC
South Burlington Vet Center	South Burlington	VT	VC
Springfield Vet Center	Springfield	MA	VC
White River Junction Vet Center	White River Junction	VT	VC
Worcester Vet Center	Worcester	MA	VC

=== VISN 2: VA NY/NJ Veterans Healthcare Network ===
Headquarters: Bronx, New York
(note: Formerly VISNs 2&3)

Facility	City	State	Type
James J. Peters VA Medical Center	Bronx	NY	HQ/VAMC
VA Hudson Valley Health Care System, Castle Point Campus	Castle Point	NY	HCS
VA New Jersey Health Care System, East Orange Campus	East Orange	NJ	HCS
VA NY Harbor Healthcare System, Brooklyn Campus	Brooklyn	NY	HCS
Northport VA Medical Center	Northport	NY	VAMC
VA Hudson Valley Health Care System (Montrose), Franklin Delano Roosevelt Campus	Montrose	NY	VAMC
VA New Jersey Health Care System, Lyons Campus	Lyons	NJ	VAMC
VA NY Harbor Healthcare System Margaret Cochran Corbin Campus	New York	NY	VAMC
St. Albans Community Living Center	Jamaica	NY	DOM
Carmel Community Clinic/Putnam County	Carmel	NY	CBOC
Chapel Street Veterans Healthcare Center	Brooklyn	NY	CBOC
Eastern Dutchess Community Clinic	Pine Plains	NY	CBOC
Elizabeth Community Clinic	Elizabeth	NJ	CBOC
Ft. Monmouth Community Clinic	Fort Monmouth	NJ	CBOC
Goshen Community Clinic	Goshen	NY	CBOC
Hackensack Community Clinic	Hackensack	NJ	CBOC
Hamilton Community Clinic	Hamilton	NJ	CBOC
Harlem Community Clinic	New York	NY	CBOC
James J. Howard Community Clinic	Toms River	NJ	CBOC
Jersey City Community Clinic	Jersey City	NJ	CBOC
Monticello Community Clinic	Monticello	NY	CBOC
Morristown Community Clinic	Morristown	NJ	CBOC
New City Community Clinic	New City	NY	CBOC
Newark Community Clinic	Newark	NJ	CBOC
Opiate Replacement Treatment Program (ORTP), Brooklyn Campus	Brooklyn	NY	REHAB
Opiate Replacement Treatment Program (ORTP), Manhattan Campus	New York	NY	REHAB
Patchogue Community Clinic	Patchogue	NY	CBOC
Paterson Community Clinic	Paterson	NJ	CBOC
Piscataway Community Clinic	Piscataway	NJ	CBOC
Plainview Community Clinic	Plainview	NY	CBOC
Port Jervis Community Clinic	Port Jervis	NY	CBOC
Poughkeepsie Community Clinic	Poughkeepsie	NY	CBOC
Queens Community Clinic	Sunnyside	NY	CBOC
Riverhead Clinic	Riverhead	NY	CBOC
Staten Island Community Clinic	Staten Island	NY	CBOC
Tinton Falls Community Based Outpatient Clinic	Tinton Falls	NJ	CBOC
Valley Stream Clinic	Valley Stream	NY	CBOC
White Plains Community Clinic	White Plains	NY	CBOC
Yonkers Community Clinic	Yonkers	NY	CBOC
Babylon Vet Center	Babylon	NY	VC
Bloomfield Vet Center	Bloomfield	NJ	VC
Bronx Vet Center	Bronx	NY	VC
Brooklyn Vet Center	Brooklyn	NY	VC
Harlem Vet Center	New York	NY	VC
Lakewood Vet Center	Lakewood	NJ	VC
Manhattan Vet Center	New York	NY	VC
Middletown Vet Center	Middletown	NY	VC
Nassau Vet Center	Hicksville	NY	VC
Queens Vet Center	Woodhaven	NY	VC
Secaucus Vet Center	Secaucus	NJ	VC
Staten Island Vet Center	Staten Island	NY	VC
Trenton Vet Center	Ewing	NJ	VC
White Plains Vet Center	White Plains	NY	VC
Albany VA Medical Center: Samuel S. Stratton	Albany	NY	VAMC
Bath VA Medical Center	Bath	NY	VAMC
Canandaigua VA Medical Center; Canandaigua Veterans Hospital Historic District	Canandaigua	NY	VAMC
Syracuse VA Medical Center	Syracuse	NY	VAMC
VA Western New York Healthcare System at Batavia; Batavia Veterans Administration Hospital	Batavia	NY	VAMC
VA Western New York Healthcare System at Buffalo	Buffalo	NY	VAMC
Auburn VA Outpatient Clinic	Auburn	NY	CBOC
Bainbridge VA Outpatient Clinic	Bainbridge	NY	CBOC
Binghamton VA Outpatient Clinic	Binghamton	NY	CBOC
Catskill VA Outpatient Clinic	Catskill	NY	CBOC
Clifton Park VA Outpatient Clinic	Clifton Park	NY	CBOC
Cortland VA Outpatient Clinic	Cortland	NY	CBOC
Dunkirk VA Outpatient Clinic	Dunkirk	NY	CBOC
Elizabethtown VA Outpatient Clinic	Elizabethtown	NY	CBOC
Elmira VA Outpatient Clinic	Elmira	NY	CBOC
Fonda VA Outpatient Clinic	Fonda	NY	CBOC
Glens Falls VA Outpatient Clinic	Glens Falls	NY	CBOC
Ithaca VA Outpatient Clinic	Ithaca	NY	CBOC
Jamestown VA Outpatient Clinic	Jamestown	NY	CBOC
Kingston VA Outpatient Clinic	Kingston	NY	CBOC
Lackawanna VA Outpatient Clinic	Lackawanna	NY	CBOC
Lockport VA Outpatient Clinic	Lockport	NY	CBOC
Malone VA Outpatient Clinic	Malone	NY	CBOC
Massena VA Outpatient Clinic	Massena	NY	CBOC
Niagara Falls VA Outpatient Clinic	Niagara Falls	NY	CBOC
Olean VA Outpatient Clinic	Olean	NY	CBOC
Oswego VA Outpatient Clinic	Oswego	NY	CBOC
Plattsburgh VA Outpatient Clinic	Plattsburgh	NY	CBOC
Rochester VA Outpatient Clinic	Rochester	NY	CBOC
Rome – Donald J. Mitchell VA Outpatient Clinic	Rome	NY	CBOC
Schenectady VA Outpatient Clinic	Schenectady	NY	CBOC
Troy VA Outpatient Clinic	Troy	NY	CBOC
Warsaw Community Based Outpatient Clinic	Warsaw	NY	CBOC
Watertown VA Outpatient Clinic	Watertown	NY	CBOC
Wellsville VA Outpatient Clinic	Wellsville	NY	CBOC
Albany Vet Center	Albany	NY	VC
Binghamton Vet Center	Binghamton	NY	VC
Buffalo Vet Center	Buffalo	NY	VC
Rochester Vet Center	Rochester	NY	VC
Syracuse Vet Center	Syracuse	NY	VC
Watertown Vet Center	Watertown	NY	VC
Watertown Mobile Vet Center	Watertown	NY	MVC

=== VISN 4: VA Healthcare – VISN 4 ===
Headquarters: Pittsburgh, Pennsylvania

Facility	City	State	Type
VA Pittsburgh Healthcare System, University Drive Division	Pittsburgh	PA	DIVIO
Coatesville VA Medical Center	Coatesville	PA	VAMC
Erie VA Medical Center	Erie	PA	VAMC
James E. Van Zandt VA Medical Center	Altoona	PA	VAMC
Louis A. Johnson VA Medical Center	Clarksburg	WV	VAMC
Lebanon VA Medical Center	Lebanon	PA	VAMC
Philadelphia VA Medical Center	Philadelphia	PA	VAMC
VA Butler Healthcare	Butler	PA	VAMC
Wilkes-Barre VA Medical Center	Wilkes-Barre	PA	VAMC
Wilmington VA Medical Center	Wilmington	DE	VAMC
VA Pittsburgh Healthcare System, H. John Heinz III Progressive Care Center	Pittsburgh	PA	DOM
Allentown CBOC	Allentown	PA	CBOC
Armstrong County VA Outpatient Clinic	Ford City	PA	CBOC
Ashtabula County VA Clinic	Ashtabula	OH	CBOC
Beaver County CBOC	Monaca	PA	CBOC
Belmont VA Primary Care Center CBOC	St. Clairsville	OH	CBOC
Berks CBOC	Reading	PA	CBOC
Berwick CBOC	Berwick	PA	CBOC
Braxton County CBOC	Sutton	WV	CBOC
Camden CBOC	Camden	NJ	CBOC
Camp Hill CBOC	Camp Hill	PA	CBOC
Cape May VA Outpatient Clinic	Cape May	NJ	CBOC
Clarion County VA Outpatient Clinic	Foxburg	PA	CBOC
Cranberry Township VA Outpatient Clinic	Cranberry Township	PA	CBOC
Crawford County CBOC	Meadville	PA	CBOC
Dover VA Outpatient Clinic	Dover	DE	CBOC
DuBois PA, James E. Van Zandt VA Clinic	DuBois	PA	CBOC
Fayette County CBOC	Uniontown	PA	CBOC
Burlington County, NJ CBOC	Marlton	NJ	CBOC
Georgetown VA Outpatient Clinic	Georgetown	DE	CBOC
Gloucester County, NJ CBOC	Sewell	NJ	CBOC
Johnstown PA, James E. Van Zandt VA Clinic	Johnstown	PA	CBOC
Lancaster CBOC	Lancaster	PA	CBOC
Lawrence County CBOC	New Castle	PA	CBOC
McKean County CBOC	Bradford	PA	CBOC
Mercer County VA Outpatient Clinic	Hermitage	PA	CBOC
Monongalia County CBOC	Westover	WV	CBOC
Northampton County CBOC	Bangor	PA	CBOC
Philadelphia MultiService Center	Philadelphia	PA	CBOC
Pottsville CBOC	Pottsville	PA	CBOC
Sayre CBOC	Sayre	PA	CBOC
Spring City CBOC	Spring City	PA	CBOC
Springfield CBOC	Springfield Township	PA	CBOC
State College PA, James E. Van Zandt VA Clinic	State College	PA	CBOC
Tobyhanna CBOC	Tobyhanna	PA	CBOC
Tucker County CBOC	Parsons	WV	CBOC
VA Clinic, NJ Veterans Memorial Home	Vineland	NJ	CBOC
Venango County CBOC	Franklin	PA	CBOC
Ventnor VA Health Clinic	Ventnor City	NJ	CBOC
Victor J. Saracini VA Outpatient Clinic	Horsham	PA	CBOC
Vineland Clinic	Vineland	NJ	CBOC
Warren CBOC	Warren	PA	CBOC
Washington County CBOC	Washington	PA	CBOC
Westmoreland County CBOC	Greensburg	PA	CBOC
Williamsport CBOC	Williamsport	PA	CBOC
Wood County CBOC	Parkersburg	WV	CBOC
York CBOC	York	PA	CBOC
Bucks County Vet Center	Bristol	PA	VC
DuBois Vet Center	DuBois	PA	VC
Erie Vet Center	Erie	PA	VC
Harrisburg Vet Center	Harrisburg	PA	VC
Lancaster Vet Center	Lancaster	PA	VC
McKeesport Vet Center	McKeesport	PA	VC
Montgomery County Vet Center	Norristown	PA	VC
Morgantown Vet Center	Morgantown	WV	VC
Philadelphia Vet Center	Philadelphia	PA	VC
Philadelphia Vet Center NE	Philadelphia	PA	VC
Pittsburgh Vet Center	Pittsburgh	PA	VC
Scranton Vet Center	Scranton	PA	VC
Ventnor Vet Center	Ventnor City	NJ	VC
Wheeling Vet Center	Wheeling	WV	VC
Williamsport Vet Center	Williamsport	PA	VC
Wilmington Vet Center	Wilmington	DE	VC
Erie Mobile Vet Center	Erie	PA	MVC
Morgantown Mobile Vet Center	Morgantown	WV	MVC
Scranton Mobile Vet Center	Scranton	PA	MVC

=== VISN 5: VA Capitol Health Care Network ===
Headquarters: Linthicum, Maryland

Facility	City	State	Type
VA Maryland Health Care System	Baltimore	MD	HCS
Baltimore VA Medical Center	Baltimore	MD	VAMC
Martinsburg VA Medical Center	Martinsburg	WV	VAMC
Perry Point VA Medical Center	Perry Point	MD	VAMC
Washington DC VA Medical Center	Washington	DC	VAMC
Loch Raven VA Community Living & Rehabilitation Center	Baltimore	MD	REHAB
Alexandria Community Based Outpatient Clinic	Alexandria	VA	CBOC
Cambridge VA Outpatient Clinic	Cambridge	MD	CBOC
Greenbelt Community Based Outpatient Clinic	Greenbelt	MD	CBOC
Southeast Community Based Outpatient Clinic	Washington	DC	CBOC
Cumberland Outpatient Clinic	Cumberland	MD	CBOC
Fort Howard VA Outpatient Clinic	Fort Howard	MD	CBOC
Franklin Contract Outpatient Clinic	Franklin	WV	CBOC
Glen Burnie VA Outpatient Clinic	Glen Burnie	MD	CBOC
Hagerstown Outpatient Clinic	Hagerstown	MD	CBOC
Harrisonburg Contract Outpatient Clinic	Harrisonburg	VA	CBOC
Loch Raven VA Outpatient Clinic	Baltimore	MD	CBOC
Petersburg Contract Outpatient Clinic	Petersburg	WV	CBOC
Pocomoke City VA Outpatient Clinic	Pocomoke City	MD	CBOC
Southern Maryland VA Outpatient Clinic	Charlotte Hall	MD	CBOC
Stephens City Outpatient Clinic	Winchester	VA	CBOC
1B RCS Mid-Atlantic Region	Towson	MD	VC
Aberdeen Vet Center Outstation	Aberdeen	MD	VC
Alexandria Vet Center	Alexandria	VA	VC
Annapolis Vet Center	Annapolis	MD	VC
Baltimore Vet Center	Baltimore	MD	VC
Cambridge Vet Center Outstation	Cambridge	MD	VC
Elkton Vet Center	Elkton	MD	VC
Martinsburg Vet Center	Martinsburg	WV	VC
Silver Spring Vet Center	Bethesda	MD	VC
Washington DC Vet Center	Washington	DC	VC

=== VISN 6: VA Mid-Atlantic Health Care Network ===
Headquarters: Durham, North Carolina

Facility	City	State	Type
Asheville VA Medical Center	Asheville	NC	VAMC
Beckley VA Medical Center	Beckley	WV	VAMC
Durham VA Medical Center	Durham	NC	VAMC
Fayetteville VA Medical Center	Fayetteville	NC	VAMC
Hampton VA Medical Center	Hampton	VA	VAMC
Hunter Holmes McGuire VA Medical Center	Richmond	VA	VAMC
Salem VA Medical Center	Salem	VA	VAMC
W.G. (Bill) Hefner VA Medical Center	Salisbury	NC	VAMC
Hickory Community Based Outpatient Clinic	Hickory	NC	CBOC
Charlotte Community Based Outpatient Clinic	Charlotte	NC	CBOC
Charlottesville Community Based Outpatient Clinic	Charlottesville	VA	CBOC
Danville Community Based Outpatient Clinic	Danville	VA	CBOC
Durham Community Based Outpatient Clinic (Hillandale Road Clinics)	Durham	NC	CBOC
Emporia Community Based Outpatient Clinic	Emporia	VA	CBOC
Franklin Community Based Outpatient Clinic	Franklin	NC	CBOC
Fredericksburg Community Based Outpatient Clinic	Fredericksburg	VA	CBOC
Greenville Community Based Outpatient Clinic	Greenville	NC	CBOC
Hamlet Community Based Outpatient Clinic	Hamlet	NC	CBOC
Jacksonville Community Based Outpatient Clinic	Midway Park	NC	CBOC
Kernersville Community Based Outpatient Clinic	Kernersville	NC	CBOC
Lynchburg Community Based Outpatient Clinic	Lynchburg	VA	CBOC
Morehead Community Based Outpatient Clinic	Morehead City	NC	CBOC
Raleigh Community Based Outpatient Clinic	Raleigh	NC	CBOC
Raleigh II Community Based Outpatient Clinic	Raleigh	NC	CBOC
Robeson County Community Based Outpatient Clinic	Pembroke	NC	CBOC
Rutherford County Community Based Outpatient Clinic	Rutherfordton	NC	CBOC
Tazewell Community Based Outpatient Clinic	Tazewell	VA	CBOC
Virginia Beach Community Based Outpatient Clinic	Virginia Beach	VA	CBOC
Wilmington Community Based Outpatient Clinic	Wilmington	NC	CBOC
Beckley Vet Center	Beckley	WV	VC
Charlotte Vet Center	Charlotte	NC	VC
Fayetteville Vet Center	Fayetteville	NC	VC
Greensboro Vet Center	Greensboro	NC	VC
Greenville NC Vet Center	Greenville	NC	VC
Norfolk Vet Center	Norfolk	VA	VC
Princeton Vet Center	Princeton	WV	VC
Raleigh Vet Center	Raleigh	NC	VC
Richmond Vet Center	Richmond	VA	VC
Roanoke Vet Center	Roanoke	VA	VC
Virginia Beach County Vet Center	Virginia Beach	VA	VC
Beckley Mobile Vet Center	Glen Jean	WV	MVC
Greenville Mobile Vet Center	Greenville	NC	MVC
Richmond Mobile Vet Center	Richmond	VA	MVC

=== VISN 7: VA Southeast Network ===
Headquarters: Duluth, Georgia

Facility	City	State	Type
VISN7: VA Southeast Network	Duluth	GA	HQ
Atlanta VA Medical Center	Decatur	GA	VAMC
Birmingham VA Medical Center	Birmingham	AL	VAMC
Carl Vinson VA Medical Center	Dublin	GA	VAMC
Central Alabama VA Medical Center–Montgomery	Montgomery	AL	VAMC
Central Alabama VA Medical Center–Tuskegee	Tuskegee	AL	VAMC
Charlie Norwood VA Medical Center	Augusta	GA	VAMC
Ralph H. Johnson VA Medical Center	Charleston	SC	VAMC
Tuscaloosa VA Medical Center	Tuscaloosa	AL	VAMC
William Jennings Bryan Dorn Veterans Affairs Medical Center	Columbia	SC	VAMC
Athens Clinic	Athens	GA	OPC
Decatur Clinic	Decatur	GA	OPC
Ft. Novosel (VA Wiregrass) Outpatient Clinic	Fort Novosel	AL	OPC
Selma Outpatient Clinic	Selma	AL	OPC
Aiken Community Based Outpatient Clinic	Aiken	SC	CBOC
Albany Clinic	Albany	GA	CBOC
Anderson County Clinic	Anderson	SC	CBOC
Anniston/Oxford Clinic	Oxford	AL	CBOC
Beaufort Clinic	Beaufort	SC	CBOC
Bessemer Clinic	Bessemer	AL	CBOC
Childersburg CBOC	Childersburg	AL	CBOC
Columbus Clinic	Columbus	GA	CBOC
Dothan Clinic	Dothan	AL	CBOC
Dothan Mental Health Center	Dothan	AL	CBOC
East Point	East Point	GA	CBOC
Florence CBOC	Florence	SC	CBOC
Gadsden Clinic	Gadsden	AL	CBOC
Goose Creek CBOC	North Charleston	SC	CBOC
Greenville Clinic	Greenville	SC	CBOC
Guntersville AL CBOC	Guntersville	AL	CBOC
Huntsville Clinic	Huntsville	AL	CBOC
Jasper Clinic	Jasper	AL	CBOC
Lawrenceville Clinic	Lawrenceville	GA	CBOC
Macon Clinic	Macon	GA	CBOC
Madison/Decatur Clinic	Madison	AL	CBOC
Myrtle Beach CBOC	Myrtle Beach	SC	CBOC
NE Georgia/Oakwood Clinic	Oakwood	GA	CBOC
Newnan Clinic	Newnan	GA	CBOC
Orangeburg County Clinic	Orangeburg	SC	CBOC
Perry Outreach Clinic	Kathleen	GA	CBOC
Rock Hill Clinic	Rock Hill	SC	CBOC
Rome CBOC	Rome	GA	CBOC
Savannah Clinic	Savannah	GA	CBOC
Shoals Area (Florence) Clinic	Sheffield	AL	CBOC
Smyrna Clinic	Smyrna	GA	CBOC
Spartanburg CBOC	Spartanburg	SC	CBOC
Stockbridge Outreach Clinic	Stockbridge	GA	CBOC
Sumter County Clinic	Sumter	SC	CBOC
Atlanta Vet Center	Atlanta	GA	VC
Birmingham Vet Center	Birmingham	AL	VC
Charleston Vet Center	North Charleston	SC	VC
Columbia Vet Center	Columbia	SC	VC
Greenville SC Vet Center	Greenville	SC	VC
Huntsville Vet Center	Huntsville	AL	VC
Lawrenceville Vet Center	Lawrenceville	GA	VC
Macon Vet Center	Macon	GA	VC
Marietta Vet Center	Marietta	GA	VC
Montgomery Vet Center	Montgomery	AL	VC
Savannah Vet Center	Savannah	GA	VC

=== VISN 8: VA Sunshine Healthcare Network ===
Headquarters: Saint Petersburg, Florida

Facility	City	State	Type
VISN 8: VA Sunshine Healthcare Network	St. Petersburg	FL	HQ
Bay Pines VA Healthcare System	Bay Pines	FL	HCS
Miami VA Healthcare System	Miami	FL	HCS
North Florida/South Georgia Veterans Health System	Gainesville	FL	HCS
VA Caribbean Healthcare System	San Juan	PR	HCS
James A. Haley Veterans' Hospital	Tampa	FL	VAMC
Lake City VAMC NF/SGVHS	Lake City	FL	VAMC
Malcom Randall VAMC, NF/SGVHS	Gainesville	FL	VAMC
Orlando VA Medical Center	Orlando	FL	VAMC
West Palm Beach VAMC	West Palm Beach	FL	VAMC
Lee County VA Healthcare Center	Cape Coral	FL	VAHCC
Jacksonville OPC	Jacksonville	FL	OPC
Mayaguez OPC	Mayagüez	PR	OPC
New Port Richey OPC	New Port Richey	FL	OPC
VA Eurípides Rubio Clinic Ponce OPC	Ponce	PR	OPC
Tallahassee OPC	Tallahassee	FL	OPC
Viera OPC	Viera	FL	OPC
William V. Chappell Jr., VA OPC	Daytona Beach	FL	OPC
St. Lucie PTSD Clinic	Port St. Lucie	FL	CSP
Arecibo CBOC	Arecibo	PR	CBOC
Boca Raton CBOC	Boca Raton	FL	CBOC
Bradenton CBOC	Bradenton	FL	CBOC
Brooksville CBOC	Brooksville	FL	CBOC
Broward County VA Clinic	Sunrise	FL	CBOC
Ceiba CBOC	Ceiba	PR	CBOC
Clermont CBOC	Clermont	FL	CBOC
Comerio Rural Outpatient Clinic	Comerío	PR	CBOC
Coral Springs CBOC	Coral Springs	FL	CBOC
Crossroads Annex	Winter Park	FL	CBOC
Deerfield Beach CBOC	Deerfield Beach	FL	CBOC
Delray Beach CBOC	Delray Beach	FL	CBOC
Deltona CBOC	Deltona	FL	CBOC
Eglin AFB CBOC	Eglin AFB	FL	CBOC
Fort Pierce CBOC	Fort Pierce	FL	CBOC
Guayama CBOC	Guayama	PR	CBOC
Healthcare for Homeless Veterans	Miami	FL	CBOC
Hollywood CBOC	Hollywood	FL	CBOC
Homestead CBOC	Homestead	FL	CBOC
Key Largo CBOC	Key Largo	FL	CBOC
Key West CBOC	Key West	FL	CBOC
Kissimmee CBOC	Kissimmee	FL	CBOC
Lakeland CBOC	Lakeland	FL	CBOC
Lecanto CBOC	Lecanto	FL	CBOC
Leesburg CBOC	Leesburg	FL	CBOC
Marianna CBOC	Marianna	FL	CBOC
Miami Outpatient Substance Abuse Clinic (OSAC)	Miami	FL	CBOC
Naples CBOC	Naples	FL	CBOC
Ocala CBOC	Ocala	FL	CBOC
Okeechobee CBOC	Okeechobee	FL	CBOC
Palm Harbor CBOC	Palm Harbor	FL	CBOC
Pembroke Pines/Hollywood CBOC	Hollywood	FL	CBOC
Port Charlotte CBOC	Port Charlotte	FL	CBOC
St. Augustine CBOC	St. Augustine	FL	CBOC
Saint Croix CBOC	Kingshill	VI	CBOC
Saint Thomas CBOC	St. Thomas	VI	CBOC
Sarasota CBOC	Sarasota	FL	CBOC
Sebring CBOC	Sebring	FL	CBOC
St. Marys CBOC	St. Marys	GA	CBOC
St. Petersburg Community-Based Outpatient Clinic	St. Petersburg	FL	CBOC
Stuart CBOC	Stuart	FL	CBOC
The Villages CBOC	The Villages	FL	CBOC
Valdosta CBOC	Valdosta	GA	CBOC
Vero Beach CBOC	Vero Beach	FL	CBOC
Vieques Rural Outpatient Clinic	Vieques	PR	CBOC
Utuado Rural Outpatient Clinic	Utuado	PR	CBOC
Zephyrhills CBOC	Zephyrhills	FL	CBOC
Arecibo Vet Center	Arecibo	PR	VC
Bay County Vet Center	Panama City	FL	VC
Clearwater Vet Center	Clearwater	FL	VC
Clermont Vet Center	Clermont	FL	VC
Daytona Beach Vet Center	Daytona Beach	FL	VC
Fort Myers Vet Center	Fort Myers	FL	VC
Fort Lauderdale Vet Center	Lauderdale Lakes	FL	VC
Gainesville Vet Center	Gainesville	FL	VC
Jacksonville Vet Center	Jacksonville	FL	VC
Jupiter Vet Center	Jupiter	FL	VC
Melbourne Vet Center	Melbourne	FL	VC
Miami Vet Center	Miami	FL	VC
Naples Vet Center	Naples	FL	VC
Ocala Vet Center	Ocala	FL	VC
Okaloosa County Vet Center	Shalimar	FL	VC
Orlando Vet Center	Orlando	FL	VC
Palm Beach Vet Center	Greenacres	FL	VC
Pasco County Vet Center	New Port Richey	FL	VC
Pensacola Vet Center	Pensacola	FL	VC
Pompano Beach Vet Center	Pompano Beach	FL	VC
Ponce Vet Center	Ponce	PR	VC
San Juan Vet Center	Río Piedras	PR	VC
Sarasota Vet Center	Sarasota	FL	VC
St. Croix Vet Center Satellite	St. Croix	VI	VC
St. Petersburg Vet Center	St. Petersburg	FL	VC
St. Thomas Vet Center Satellite	St. Thomas	VI	VC
Tallahassee Vet Center	Tallahassee	FL	VC
Tampa Vet Center	Tampa	FL	VC

=== VISN 9: VA Mid South Healthcare Network ===
Headquarters: Nashville, Tennessee

Facility	City	State	Type
VISN 9: VA Mid South Healthcare Network	Nashville	TN	HQ
Hershel "Woody" Williams VA Medical Center	Huntington	WV	VAMC
Lexington VAMC: Troy Bowling Campus – formerly Cooper Division	Lexington	KY	VAMC
Lexington VAMC: Franklin R. Sousley Campus – formerly Leestown Division	Lexington	KY	VAMC
Memphis VA Medical Center	Memphis	TN	VAMC
Mountain Home VA Medical Center	Mountain Home	TN	VAMC
Robley Rex VA Medical Center	Louisville	KY	VAMC
Tennessee Valley Healthcare System – Alvin C. York (Murfreesboro) Campus	Murfreesboro	TN	VAMC
Tennessee Valley Healthcare System – Nashville Campus	Nashville	TN	VAMC
Bristol, Virginia OPC	Bristol	VA	OPC
Charlotte Avenue (Nashville, TN) OPC	Nashville	TN	OPC
Chattanooga, Tennessee CBOC	Chattanooga	TN	OPC
Cookeville, Tennessee OPC	Cookeville	TN	OPC
Hopkinsville, Kentucky OPC	Hopkinsville	KY	OPC
McMinnville, Tennessee OPC	McMinnville	TN	OPC
Standiford Field, Kentucky OPC	Louisville	KY	OPC
Women Veterans Healthcare Center (Nashville, TN)	Nashville	TN	OPC
Berea, Kentucky CBOC	Berea	KY	CBOC
Bolivar, Tennessee CBOC	Bolivar	TN	CBOC
Bowling Green, Kentucky CBOC	Bowling Green	KY	CBOC
Byhalia, Mississippi CBOC	Byhalia	MS	CBOC
Charleston, West Virginia CBOC	Charleston	WV	CBOC
Clarksville, Tennessee CBOC	Clarksville	TN	CBOC
Covington, Tennessee (North Memphis) CBOC	Memphis	TN	CBOC
Dover (Stewart County), Tennessee CBOC	Dover	TN	CBOC
Dyersburg, Tennessee CBOC	Dyersburg	TN	CBOC
Ft. Campbell CBOC	Fort Campbell	KY	CBOC
Hazard CBOC	Hazard	KY	CBOC
Helena, Arkansas CBOC	Helena	AR	CBOC
Houlka, Mississippi CBOC	Houlka	MS	CBOC
Jackson, Tennessee CBOC	Jackson	TN	CBOC
Jonesboro, Arkansas CBOC	Jonesboro	AR	CBOC
Knoxville, Tennessee CBOC	Knoxville	TN	CBOC
Logan, West Virginia CBOC	Logan	WV	CBOC
Memphis, Tennessee (South) CBOC	Memphis	TN	CBOC
Morehead CBOC	Morehead	KY	CBOC
Morristown, Tennessee CBOC	Morristown	TN	CBOC
Norton, Virginia CBOC	Norton	VA	CBOC
Prestonsburg, Kentucky CBOC	Prestonsburg	KY	CBOC
Rogersville, Tennessee CBOC	Rogersville	TN	CBOC
Savannah, Tennessee CBOC	Savannah	TN	CBOC
Smithville, Mississippi CBOC	Smithville	MS	CBOC
Somerset, Kentucky CBOC	Somerset	KY	CBOC
Tullahoma, Tennessee CBOC	Arnold AFB	TN	CBOC
VA Healthcare Center, Carrollton	Carrollton	KY	CBOC
VA Healthcare Center, Dupont Kentucky CBOC	Louisville	KY	CBOC
VA Healthcare Center, Ft. Knox Kentucky	Fort Knox	KY	CBOC
VA Healthcare Center, Grayson	Clarkson	KY	CBOC
VA Healthcare Center, New Albany Indiana	New Albany	IN	CBOC
VA Healthcare Center, Newburg Kentucky	Louisville	KY	CBOC
VA Healthcare Center, Scott County	Scottsburg	IN	CBOC
VA Healthcare Center, Shively Kentucky CBOC	Louisville	KY	CBOC
Vine Hill (Nashville, Tennessee)	Nashville	TN	CBOC
Williamson, West Virginia	Williamson	WV	CBOC
Charleston Vet Center	Charleston	WV	VC
Chattanooga Vet Center	Chattanooga	TN	VC
Huntington Vet Center	Huntington	WV	VC
Johnson City Vet Center	Johnson City	TN	VC
Knoxville Vet Center	Knoxville	TN	VC
Lexington Vet Center	Lexington	KY	VC
Logan Vet Center Outstation	Henlawson	WV	VC
Louisville Vet Center	Louisville	KY	VC
Memphis Vet Center	Memphis	TN	VC
Nashville Vet Center	Nashville	TN	VC
Parkersburg Vet Center Outstation	Parkersburg	WV	VC

=== VISN 10: VA Healthcare System Serving Indiana, Michigan and Ohio ===
Headquarters: Mason, Ohio
(Note: Formerly VISN's 10 and 11)

Facility	City	State	Type
VISN 10: VA Healthcare System Serving Indiana, Michigan and Ohio	Mason	OH	HQ
VA Indiana Healthcare System	Indianapolis	IN	VAHCS
Richard L. Roudebush VA Medical Center	Indianapolis	IN	VAMC
Bloomington VA Clinic	Bloomington	IN	VAC
Brownsburg VA Clinic	Brownsburg	IN	VAC
Cold Springs Road VA Clinic	Indianapolis	IN	OSS
Indianapolis VA Clinic	Indianapolis	IN	OSS
Indianapolis VA Domiciliary	Indianapolis	IN	DOM
Indianapolis YMCA VA Clinic	Indianapolis	IN	OSS
Lafayette VA Clinic	Lafayette	IN	VAC
Shelbyville VA Clinic	Shelbyville	IN	VAC
Terre Haute VA Clinic	Terre Haute	IN	VAC
Wakeman VA Clinic (Camp Atterbury)	Edinburgh	IN	VAC
Indianapolis Vet Center (In VISN 10 geographic area, not a reporting unit)	Indianapolis	IN	VC
VA Northern Indiana Healthcare System	Marion	IN	VAHCS
Marion VA Medical Center	Marion	IN	VAMC
Fort Wayne VA Medical Center	Fort Wayne	IN	VAMC
Defiance VA Clinic	Defiance	OH	VAC
Fort Wayne VA Clinic (VAMC Outpatient Annex)	Fort Wayne	IN	OSS
Hoosier VA Clinic	Peru	IN	VAC
Huntington VA Clinic	Huntington	IN	VAC
Jackie Walorski VA Clinic	Mishawaka	IN	VAC
Muncie VA Clinic	Muncie	IN	VAC
Fort Wayne Vet Center (In VISN 10 geographic area, not a reporting unit)	Fort Wayne	IN	VC
VA Ann Arbor Healthcare System	Ann Arbor	MI	VAHCS
Lieutenant Colonel Charles S. Kettles Veterans Affairs Medical Center	Ann Arbor	MI	VAMC
Adrian VA Clinic	Adrian	MI	VAC
Findlay VA Clinic	Findlay	OH	VAC
Flint VA Clinic	Flint	MI	VAC
Green Road VA Clinic	Ann Arbor	MI	VAC
Howell VA Clinic	Howell	MI	VAC
Jackson VA Clinic	Michigan Center	MI	VAC
Major General Oliver W. Dillard VA Clinic	Canton	MI	VAC
Packard Road VA Clinic	Ann Arbor	MI	VAC
Toledo VA Clinic	Toledo	OH	VAC
Toledo Vet Center (In VISN 10 geographic area, not a reporting unit)	Toledo	OH	VC
VA Battle Creek Healthcare System	Battle Creek	MI	VAHCS
Battle Creek VA Medical Center	Battle Creek	MI	VAMC
Wyoming VA Clinic	Wyoming	MI	HCC
Benton Harbor VA Clinic	Benton Harbor	MI	VAC
Century Avenue VA Clinic	Battle Creek	MI	OSS
Lansing VA Clinic	Lansing	MI	VAC
Muskegon VA Clinic	Muskegon	MI	VAC
Grand Rapids Vet Center (In VISN 10 geographic area, not a reporting unit)	Grand Rapids	MI	VC
VA Detroit Healthcare System	Detroit	MI	VAHCS
John D. Dingell VA Medical Center	Detroit	MI	VAMC
Detroit VA Medical Center – Valor Center	Detroit	MI	DOM
Downriver VA Clinic	Trenton	MI	VAC
Piquette Street VA Clinic	Detroit	MI	OSS
Pontiac VA Clinic	Pontiac	MI	VAC
Yale VA Clinic	Yale	MI	VAC
Dearborn Vet Center (In VISN 10 geographic area, not a reporting unit)	Dearborn	MI	VC
Detroit Vet Center (In VISN 10 geographic area, not a reporting unit)	Detroit	MI	VC
Pontiac Vet Center (In VISN 10 geographic area, not a reporting unit)	Pontiac	MI	VC
Macomb County Vet Center (In VISN 10 geographic area, not a reporting unit)	Clinton Township	MI	VC
VA Saginaw Healthcare System	Detroit	MI	VAHCS
Aleda E. Lutz VA Medical Center	Saginaw	MI	VAMC
Bad Axe VA Clinic	Bad Axe	MI	VAC
Clare VA Clinic	Clare	MI	VAC
Colonel Demas T. Craw VA Clinic	Traverse City	MI	VAC
Duane E. Dewey VA Clinic	Cadillac	MI	VAC
Grayling VA Clinic	Grayling	MI	VAC
Lieutenant Colonel Clement C. Van Wagoner Department of Veterans Affairs Clinic	Pontiac	MI	VAC
Navy Corpsman Steve Andrews Department of Veterans Affairs Health Care Clinic	Pontiac	MI	VAC
Oscoda VA Clinic	Oscoda	MI	VAC
Pfc. Justin T. Paton Department of Veterans Affairs Clinic	Indian River	MI	VAC
Saginaw North VA Clinic	Saginaw	MI	VAC
Saginaw VA Clinic (VAMC Outpatient Annex)	Pontiac	MI	OSS
Great Lakes Bay Vet Center (In VISN 10 geographic area, not a reporting unit)	Bay City	MI	VC
Traverse City Vet Center (In VISN 10 geographic area, not a reporting unit)	Traverse City	MI	VC
VA Chillicothe Healthcare System	Chillicothe	OH	VAHCS
Chillicothe VA Medical Center	Chillicothe	OH	VAMC
Athens VA Clinic	The Plains	OH	VAC
Cambridge VA Clinic	Cambridge	OH	VAC
Lancaster VA Clinic	Lancaster	OH	VAC
Marietta VA Clinic	Marietta	OH	VAC
Portsmouth VA Clinic	Portsmouth	OH	VAC
Wilmington VA Clinic	Wilmington	OH	VAC
VA Cincinnati Healthcare System	Cincinnati	OH	VAHCS
Cincinnati VA Medical Center	Cincinnati	OH	VAMC
Bellevue VA Clinic	Bellevue	KY	VAC
Cincinnati VA Medical Center – Fort Thomas	Fort Thomas	KY	DOM
Clermont County VA Clinic	Batavia	OH	VAC
Dearborn VA Clinic	Lawrenceburg	IN	VAC
Eden Park VA Clinic (VAMC Eye Clinic Annex)	Cincinnati	OH	OSS
Florence VA Clinic	Florence	KY	VAC
Georgetown VA Clinic	Georgetown	OH	VAC
Hamilton VA Clinic	Hamilton	OH	VAC
Norwood VA Clinic	Norwood	OH	VAC
Vine Street VA Clinic (VAMC Outpatient Annex)	Cincinnati	OH	OSS
Cincinnati Vet Center (In VISN 10 geographic area, not a reporting unit)	Cincinnati	OH	VC
VA Northeast Ohio Healthcare System	Cleveland	OH	VAHCS
Louis Stokes Cleveland VA Medical Center	Cleveland	OH	VAMC
Akron VA Clinic	Akron	OH	VAC
Akron West VA Clinic	Akron	OH	VAC
Canton VAC Clinic	Canton	OH	VAC
Carl Nunziato VA Clinic	Youngstown	OH	VAC
Cleveland VA Clinic – Euclid (VAMC Dialysis and Resource Center Annex)	Cleveland	OH	OOS
Cleveland VA Clinic – Superior (VAMC Outpatient Surgery Annex)	Cleveland	OH	OOS
David F. Winder Department of Veterans Affairs Community Based Outpatient Clinic	Mansfield	OH	VAC
East Liverpool VA Clinic	Calcutta	OH	VAC
Kent VA Clinic	Kent	OH	VAC
Lake County VA Clinic	Willoughby	OH	VAC
Lorain VA Clinic	Lorain	OH	VAC
New Philadelphia VA Clinic	New Philadelphia	OH	VAC
Parma VA Clinic	Parma	OH	VAC
Ravenna VA Clinic	Ravenna	OH	VAC
Sandusky VA Clinic	Sandusky	OH	VAC
Summit County VA Clinic	Akron	OH	OSS
Warren VA Clinic	Warren	OH	VAC
Parma Vet Center (In VISN 10 geographic area, not a reporting unit)	Parma Heights	OH	VC
Cleveland Vet Center	Oakwood Village	OH	VC
VA Central Ohio Healthcare System	Columbus	OH	VAHCS
Chalmers P. Wylie Veterans Outpatient Clinic	Columbus	OH	HCC
Daniel L. Kinnard VA Clinic	Newark	OH	VAC
Delaware VA Clinic	Delaware	OH	VAC
Grove City VA Clinic	Grove City	OH	VAC
Marion VA Clinic	Marion	OH	VAC
Zanesville VA Clinic	Zanesville	OH	VAC
Columbus Vet Center (In VISN 10 geographic area, not a reporting unit)	Columbus	OH	VC
VA Dayton Healthcare System	Dayton	OH	VAHCS
Dayton VA Medical Center	Dayton	OH	VAMC
Lima VA Clinic	Lima	OH	VAC
Middletown VA Clinic	Middletown	OH	VAC
Richmond VA Clinic	Richmond	IN	VAC
Springfield VA Clinic	Springfield	OH	VAC
Wright-Patterson VA Clinic (Wright-Patterson Air Force Base)	Wright-Patterson AFB	OH	VAC
Dayton Vet Center (In VISN 10 geographic area, not a reporting unit)	Dayton	OH	VC

=== VISN 12: VA Great Lakes Health Care System ===
Headquarters: Hines, Illinois

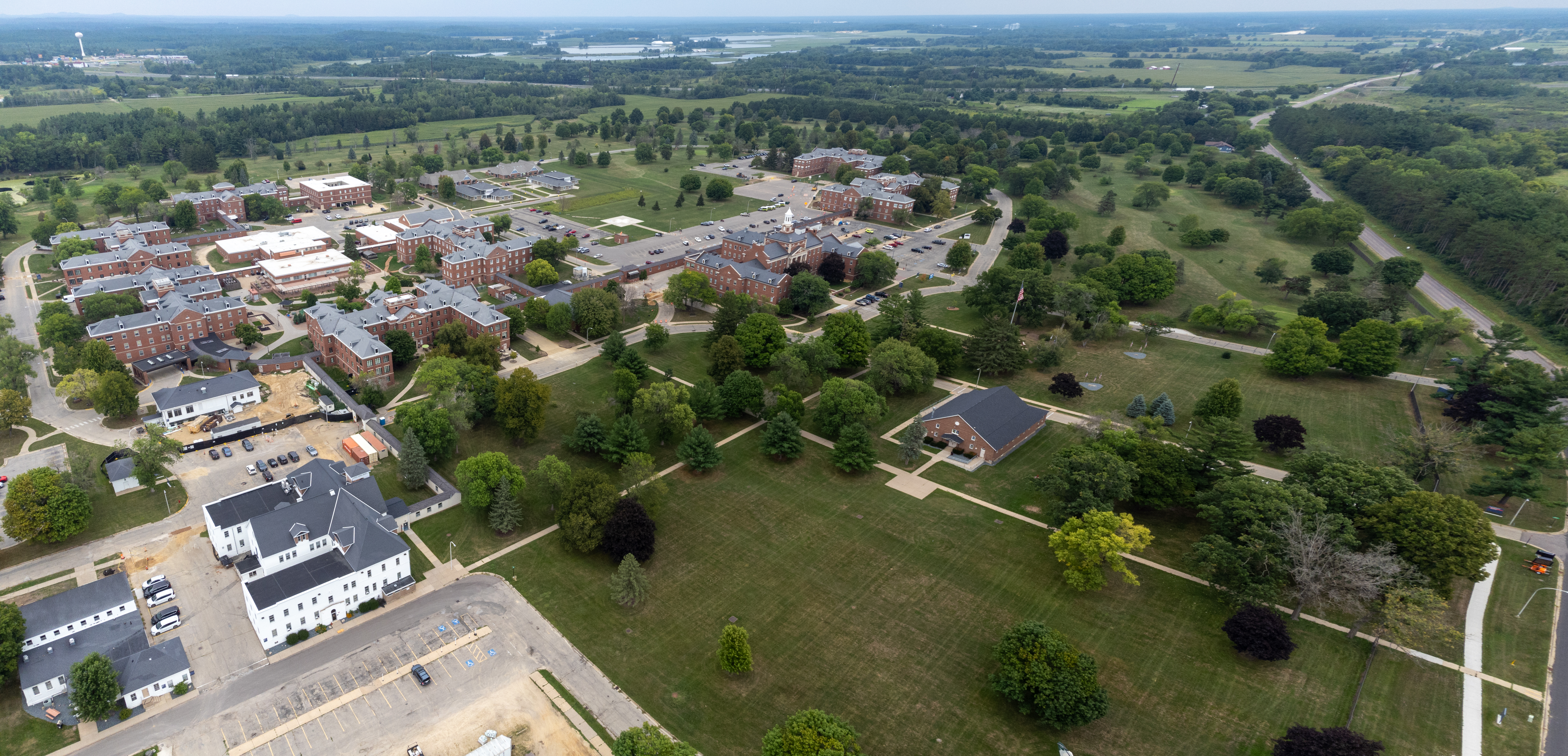
Tomah Veterans Affairs Medical Center

Facility	City	State	Type
VISN 12: VA Great Lakes Health Care System	Hines	IL	HQ
Clement J. Zablocki Veterans Affairs Medical Center	Milwaukee	WI	VAMC
Edward Hines Jr. Veterans Administration Hospital	Hines	IL	VAMC
Jesse Brown VA Medical Center	Chicago	IL	VAMC
Captain James A. Lovell Federal Health Care Center	North Chicago	IL	VADOD
Oscar G. Johnson VA Medical Center	Iron Mountain	MI	VAMC
Tomah VA Medical Center	Tomah	WI	VAMC
William S. Middleton Memorial Veterans Hospital	Madison	WI	VAMC
Adam Benjamin Jr. OPC	Crown Point	IN	CBOC
Appleton Clinic (John H. Bradley)	Appleton	WI	CBOC
Auburn Gresham (Chicago) Clinic	Chicago	IL	CBOC
Aurora Clinic	North Aurora	IL	CBOC
Baraboo Clinic	Baraboo	WI	CBOC
Beaver Dam Clinic	Beaver Dam	WI	CBOC
Chicago Heights Clinic	Chicago Heights	IL	CBOC
Cleveland Clinic	Cleveland	WI	CBOC
Elgin Clinic	Elgin	IL	CBOC
Evanston Clinic	Evanston	IL	CBOC
Freeport Clinic	Freeport	IL	CBOC
Green Bay Clinic (Milo C. Huempfner)	Green Bay	WI	CBOC
Gladstone Clinic	Gladstone	MI	CBOC
Hancock Clinic	Hancock	MI	CBOC
Ironwood Clinic	Ironwood	MI	CBOC
Janesville Clinic	Janesville	WI	CBOC
Joliet Clinic	Joliet	IL	CBOC
Kenosha Clinic	Kenosha	WI	CBOC
Lakeside Clinic	Chicago	IL	CBOC
LaSalle Clinic	LaSalle	IL	CBOC
Loyal Clinic	Loyal	WI	CBOC
Manistique Outreach Clinic	Manistique	MI	CBOC
Manteno Clinic	Manteno	IL	CBOC
Marquette Clinic	Marquette	MI	CBOC
McHenry Clinic	McHenry	IL	CBOC
Menominee Clinic	Menominee	MI	CBOC
Oak Lawn Clinic	Oak Lawn	IL	CBOC
Rhinelander Clinic	Rhinelander	WI	CBOC
River Valley Clinic	La Crosse	WI	CBOC
Rockford Clinic	Rockford	IL	CBOC
Sault Ste. Marie Clinic	Kincheloe	MI	CBOC
Union Grove Clinic	Union Grove	WI	CBOC
Wausau Clinic	Wausau	WI	CBOC
Wisconsin Rapids Clinic	Wisconsin Rapids	WI	CBOC
Chicago Heights Vet Center	Chicago Heights	IL	VC
Chicago Veterans Resource Center	Chicago	IL	VC
DuPage County Vet Center	Aurora	IL	VC
Escanaba Vet Center	Escanaba	MI	VC
Evanston Vet Center	Evanston	IL	VC
Gary Area Vet Center	Merrillville	IN	VC
Green Bay Vet Center	Green Bay	WI	VC
Madison Vet Center	Madison	WI	VC
Milwaukee Vet Center	Milwaukee	WI	VC
Oak Park Vet Center	Oak Park	IL	VC
Orland Park Vet Center	Orland Park	IL	VC
Rockford Vet Center Outstation	Rockford	IL	VC

=== VISN 13 & 14 (merged to 23) ===
VISN 13 & 14 merged into VISN 23.

=== VISN 15: VA Heartland Health Care Network ===
Headquarters: Kansas City, Missouri

Facility	City	State	Type
Harry S. Truman Memorial	Columbia	MO	VAMC
John J. Pershing VA Medical Center	Poplar Bluff	MO	VAMC
Kansas City VA Medical Center	Kansas City	MO	VAMC
Marion Veterans Affairs Medical Center	Marion	IL	VAMC
Robert J. Dole Dept. of Veterans Affairs Medical and Regional Office Center	Wichita	KS	VAMC
St. Louis VA Medical Center – Jefferson Barracks Division	St. Louis	MO	VAMC
St. Louis VA Medical Center – John Cochran Division	St. Louis	MO	VAMC
VA Eastern Kansas HCS – Colmery-O'Neil VA Medical Center	Topeka	KS	VAMC
VA Eastern Kansas HCS – Dwight D. Eisenhower VA Medical Center	Leavenworth	KS	VAMC
Evansville Outpatient Clinic	Evansville	IN	IOC
Anderson County Hospital (Garnett)	Garnett	KS	CBOC
Belleville Clinic	Belleville	IL	CBOC
Belton CBOC	Belton	MO	CBOC
Cameron Clinic	Cameron	MO	CBOC
Cape Girardeau CBOC	Cape Girardeau	MO	CBOC
Carbondale CBOC	Carbondale	IL	CBOC
Effingham Community Based Outpatient Clinic	Effingham	IL	CBOC
Emporia CBOC	Emporia	KS	CBOC
Farmington CBOC	Farmington	MO	CBOC
Ft Scott CBOC	Fort Scott	KS	CBOC
Ft. Dodge Clinic	Fort Dodge	KS	CBOC
Ft. Leonard Wood CBOC	Fort Leonard Wood	MO	CBOC
Hanson Community Based Outpatient Clinic	Hanson	KY	CBOC
Hays Clinic	Hays	KS	CBOC
Holton Community Hospital	Holton	KS	CBOC
Hutchinson CBOC	Hutchinson	KS	CBOC
Jefferson City VA CBOC	Jefferson City	MO	CBOC
Junction City	Junction City	KS	CBOC
Lake of the Ozarks CBOC	Camdenton	MO	CBOC
Lawrence	Lawrence	KS	CBOC
Liberal Clinic	Liberal	KS	CBOC
Louisburg-Paola Clinic	Paola	KS	CBOC
Mayfield Community Based Outpatient Clinic	Mayfield	KY	CBOC
Mexico VA CBOC / Missouri Veterans Home	Mexico	MO	CBOC
Missouri Veterans Clinic	St. Louis	MO	CBOC
Mt. Vernon Community Based Outpatient Clinic	Mount Vernon	IL	CBOC
Nemaha Valley Community Hospital	Seneca	KS	CBOC
Neosho Memorial Medical Center (Chanute)	Chanute	KS	CBOC
Nevada Clinic	Nevada	MO	CBOC
North East Missouri Health Council	Kirksville	MO	CBOC
Owensboro Community Based Outpatient Clinic	Owensboro	KY	CBOC
Paducah Community Based Outpatient Clinic	Paducah	KY	CBOC
Paragould Clinic	Paragould	AR	CBOC
Parsons Clinic	Parsons	KS	CBOC
Salem Clinic	Salem	MO	CBOC
Salina Clinic	Salina	KS	CBOC
St. Charles Clinic	St. Charles	MO	CBOC
St. James VA Clinic / Missouri Veterans Home	St. James	MO	CBOC
St. Joseph Clinic	St. Joseph	MO	CBOC
Vincennes Community Based Outpatient Clinic	Vincennes	IN	CBOC
Warrensburg Clinic	Warrensburg	MO	CBOC
West Plains CBOC	West Plains	MO	CBOC
Wyandotte CBOC	Kansas City	KS	CBOC
2 Central Regional Office	St. Louis	MO	VC
East St. Louis Vet Center	East St. Louis	IL	VC
Evansville Vet Center	Evansville	IN	VC
Kansas City Vet Center	Kansas City	MO	VC
Manhattan Vet Center	Manhattan	KS	VC
St. Louis Vet Center	St. Louis	MO	VC
Wichita Vet Center	Wichita	KS	VC

=== VISN 16: VA South Central Health Care Network ===
Headquarters: Ridgeland, Mississippi

Facility	City	State	Type
Alexandria VA Medical Center	Pineville	LA	VAMC
Central Arkansas VA HCS Eugene J. Towbin Healthcare Center	North Little Rock	AR	VAMC
Central Arkansas VA HCS John L. McClellan Memorial Veterans Hospital	Little Rock	AR	VAMC
G.V. (Sonny) Montgomery VA Medical Center	Jackson	MS	VAMC
Jack C. Montgomery VAMC	Muskogee	OK	VAMC
Michael E. DeBakey VA Medical Center	Houston	TX	VAMC
Oklahoma City VA Medical Center	Oklahoma City	OK	VAMC
Overton Brooks VA Medical Center	Shreveport	LA	VAMC
Southeast Louisiana Veterans Health Care System	New Orleans	LA	VAMC
VA Gulf Coast Veterans Health Care System	Biloxi	MS	VAMC
Veterans Health Care System of the Ozarks	Fayetteville	AR	VAMC
Houston Domiciliary Care for Homeless Veterans	Houston	TX	REHAB
Baton Rouge Outpatient Clinic	Baton Rouge	LA	IOC
Beaumont VA Outpatient Clinic	Beaumont	TX	IOC
Charles Wilson VA Outpatient Clinic	Lufkin	TX	IOC
Ernest Childers VA Outpatient Clinic (Tulsa)	Tulsa	OK	IOC
Hammond VA Outpatient Clinic	Hammond	LA	IOC
Jennings Clinic	Jennings	LA	IOC
Lafayette Clinic	Lafayette	LA	IOC
Lawton/Ft Sill Clinic	Fort Sill	OK	IOC
North May Clinic	Oklahoma City	OK	IOC
Slidell VA Outpatient Clinic	Slidell	LA	IOC
St. John VA Outpatient Clinic	Reserve	LA	IOC
VA Gulf Coast Health Care System – Mobile Outpatient Clinic	Mobile	AL	IOC
VA Gulf Coast Health Care System – Panama Outpatient Clinic	Panama City Beach	FL	IOC
VA Gulf Coast Health Care System – Pensacola Outpatient Clinic	Pensacola	FL	IOC
Vinita Outpatient Clinic	Vinita	OK	IOC
Altus Outpatient Clinic	Altus	OK	CBOC
Ardmore CBOC	Ardmore	OK	CBOC
Blackwell CBOC	Blackwell	OK	CBOC
Branson CBOC	Branson	MO	CBOC
Burnett-Croom CBOC	Mountain Home	AR	CBOC
Columbus Clinic	Columbus	MS	CBOC
Conroe VA Outpatient Clinic	Conroe	TX	CBOC
Eglin Community Based Outpatient Clinic	Eglin Air Force Base	FL	CBOC
El Dorado CBOC	El Dorado	AR	CBOC
Enid COPC	Enid	OK	CBOC
Ft. Smith CBOC	Fort Smith	AR	CBOC
Galveston VA Outpatient Clinic	Galveston	TX	CBOC
Greenville CBOC	Greenville	MS	CBOC
Harrison CBOC	Harrison	AR	CBOC
Hartshorne VA Outpatient Clinic	Hartshorne	OK	CBOC
Hattiesburg CBOC	Hattiesburg	MS	CBOC
Hot Springs CBOC	Hot Springs	AR	CBOC
Houma CBOC	Houma	LA	CBOC
Jay CBOC	Jay	OK	CBOC
Joplin CBOC	Joplin	MO	CBOC
Kosciusko CBOC	Kosciusko	MS	CBOC
Longview CBOC	Longview	TX	CBOC
Meadville CBOC	Meadville	MS	CBOC
Mena CBOC	Mena	AR	CBOC
Meridian CBOC	Meridian	MS	CBOC
Mobile Outpatient Clinic	Mobile	AL	CBOC
Monroe CBOC	Monroe	LA	CBOC
Mountain Home CBOC	Mountain Home	AR	CBOC
Natchez CBOC	Natchez	MS	CBOC
Natchitoches CBOC	Natchitoches	LA	CBOC
Ozark CBOC	Ozark	AR	CBOC
Pensacola Outpatient Clinic	Pensacola	FL	CBOC
Pine Bluff CBOC	Pine Bluff	AR	CBOC
Springfield CBOC	Springfield	MO	CBOC
Stillwater Outpatient Clinic	Stillwater	OK	CBOC
Texarkana CBOC	Texarkana	AR	CBOC
Texas City VA Outpatient Clinic	Texas City	TX	CBOC
VA Outpatient Medical Clinic Naval Support Activity, Bldg 387	Panama City Beach	FL	CBOC
Veterans Clinic of North Texas	Wichita Falls	TX	CBOC
Baton Rouge Vet Center	Baton Rouge	LA	VC
Biloxi Vet Center	Biloxi	MS	VC
Fayetteville Vet Center	Fayetteville	AR	VC
Harris County Vet Center	Houston	TX	VC
Houston Vet Center	Houston	TX	VC
Houston Veterans Resource Center	Houston	TX	VC
Jackson Vet Center	Jackson	MS	VC
Lawton Vet Center	Lawton	OK	VC
Little Rock Vet Center	North Little Rock	AR	VC
Mobile Vet Center	Mobile	AL	VC
New Orleans Veterans Resource Center	Kenner	LA	VC
Oklahoma City Vet Center	Oklahoma City	OK	VC
Pensacola Vet Center	Pensacola	FL	VC
Shreveport Vet Center	Shreveport	LA	VC
Springfield Vet Center	Springfield	MO	VC
Tulsa Vet Center	Tulsa	OK	VC

=== VISN 17: VA Heart of Texas Health Care Network ===
Headquarters: Arlington, Texas

Facility	City	State	Type
Central Texas Veterans Health Care System	Temple	TX	HCS
South Texas Veterans Health Care System	San Antonio	TX	HCS
VA North Texas Health Care System: Dallas VA Medical Center	Dallas	TX	HCS
Central Texas Veterans Health Care System – Olin E Teague Veterans' Center	Temple	TX	VAMC
Central Texas Veterans Health Care System – Waco VA Medical Center	Waco	TX	VAMC
Kerrville VA Medical Center	Kerrville	TX	VAMC
VA North Texas Health Care System: Sam Rayburn Memorial Veterans Center	Bonham	TX	VAMC
Austin Outpatient Clinic	Austin	TX	IOC
Balcones Heights Outpatient Clinic	San Antonio	TX	IOC
Corpus Christi OPC	Corpus Christi	TX	IOC
Frank M. Tejeda VA Outpatient Clinic	San Antonio	TX	IOC
Harlingen Outpatient Clinic	Harlingen	TX	IOC
Laredo Outpatient Clinic	Laredo	TX	IOC
McAllen Outpatient Clinic	McAllen	TX	IOC
North Central Federal OPC	San Antonio	TX	IOC
San Antonio Dental Clinic	San Antonio	TX	IOC
Tyler VA Primary Care Clinic	Tyler	TX	IOC
VA North Texas Health Care System: Fort Worth Outpatient Clinic	Fort Worth	TX	IOC
Victoria OPC	Victoria	TX	IOC
Acton Clinic	Granbury	TX	CBOC
Beeville CBOC	Beeville	TX	CBOC
Bridgeport Family Clinic	Bridgeport	TX	CBOC
Brownwood CBOC	Brownwood	TX	CBOC
Bryan/College Station CBOC	College Station	TX	CBOC
Cedar Park CBOC	Cedar Park	TX	CBOC
Del Rio CBOC	Del Rio	TX	CBOC
Denton CBOC	Denton	TX	CBOC
General McMullen/San Antonio Clinic	San Antonio	TX	CBOC
Kingsville CBOC	Kingsville	TX	CBOC
LaGrange OutReach Clinic	La Grange	TX	CBOC
New Braunfels CBOC	New Braunfels	TX	CBOC
NorthEast 410 /San Antonio Clinic	San Antonio	TX	CBOC
Northeast Texas Primary Care	Paris	TX	CBOC
Northwest 410/San Antonio Clinic	San Antonio	TX	CBOC
Palestine CBOC	Palestine	TX	CBOC
Pecan Valley	San Antonio	TX	CBOC
Sandknop Family Practice	Greenville	TX	CBOC
Seguin CBOC	Seguin	TX	CBOC
Sherman Clinic	Sherman	TX	CBOC
South Bexer/San Antonio Clinic	San Antonio	TX	CBOC
Univ. of N. Texas Health Science Center at Fort Worth CBOC	Fort Worth	TX	CBOC
Uvalde CBOC	Uvalde	TX	CBOC
3B South Central Regional Office	Dallas	TX	VC
Arlington Vet Center	Pantego	TX	VC
Austin Vet Center	Austin	TX	VC
Corpus Christi Vet Center	Corpus Christi	TX	VC
Dallas Vet Center	Dallas	TX	VC
Fort Worth Vet Center	Fort Worth	TX	VC
Harris County Vet Center	Houston	TX	VC
Killeen Heights Vet Center	Harker Heights	TX	VC
Laredo Vet Center	Laredo	TX	VC
McAllen Vet Center	McAllen	TX	VC
San Antonio NE Vet Center	San Antonio	TX	VC
San Antonio NW Vet Center	San Antonio	TX	VC

=== VISN 18: VA Southwest Health Care Network ===
Headquarters: Mesa, Arizona

Facility	City	State	Type
Amarillo VA Health Care System	Amarillo	TX	VAMC
El Paso VA Health Care System	El Paso	TX	VAMC
New Mexico VA Health Care System	Albuquerque	NM	VAMC
Northern Arizona VA Health Care System	Prescott	AZ	VAMC
Phoenix VA Health Care System	Phoenix	AZ	VAMC
Southern Arizona VA Health Care System	Tucson	AZ	VAMC
West Texas VA Health Care System	Big Spring	TX	VAMC
Lubbock Outpatient Clinic	Lubbock	TX	IOC
Abilene CBOC	Abilene	TX	CBOC
Alamogordo CCBOC	Alamogordo	NM	CBOC
Anthem CBOC	Anthem	AZ	CBOC
Artesia Clinic	Artesia	NM	CBOC
Bellemont CBOC	Bellemont	AZ	CBOC
Buckeye CBOC	Buckeye	AZ	CBOC
Casa Grande CBOC	Casa Grande	AZ	CBOC
Childress Clinic	Childress	TX	CBOC
Clovis CBOC	Clovis	NM	CBOC
Cottonwood CBOC	Cottonwood	AZ	CBOC
Dr Subodh Malik Clinic	Fort Stockton	TX	CBOC
Durango CCBOC	Durango	CO	CBOC
Eastside El Paso CBOC	El Paso	TX	CBOC
Espanola CCBOC	Española	NM	CBOC
Farmington CBOC	Farmington	NM	CBOC
Gallup CBOC	Gallup	NM	CBOC
Globe-Miami VA Health Care Clinic	Globe	AZ	CBOC
Green Valley CBOC	Green Valley	AZ	CBOC
Hobbs CBOC	Hobbs	NM	CBOC
Kingman CBOC	Kingman	AZ	CBOC
Lake Havasu City CBOC	Lake Havasu City	AZ	CBOC
Las Cruces CBOC	Las Cruces	NM	CBOC
Las Vegas CCBOC	Las Vegas	NM	CBOC
Liberal Clinic	Liberal	KS	CBOC
Northwest VA Health Care Clinic	Sun City	AZ	CBOC
Odessa Clinic	Odessa	TX	CBOC
Payson VA Health Care Clinic	Payson	AZ	CBOC
Raton CBOC	Raton	NM	CBOC
Safford Clinic	Safford	AZ	CBOC
San Angelo Clinic	San Angelo	TX	CBOC
Santa Fe CBOC	Santa Fe	NM	CBOC
Show Low VA Health Care Clinic	Show Low	AZ	CBOC
Sierra Vista Clinic	Sierra Vista	AZ	CBOC
Silver City Clinic	Silver City	NM	CBOC
Southeast VA Health Care Clinic	Mesa	AZ	CBOC
Stamford Clinic	Stamford	TX	CBOC
Thunderbird VA Health Care Clinic	Phoenix	AZ	CBOC
Truth or Consequences CCBOC	Truth or Consequences	NM	CBOC
VA Northwest Tucson Clinic	Tucson	AZ	CBOC
VA Southeast Tucson Clinic	Tucson	AZ	CBOC
Yuma Clinic	Yuma	AZ	CBOC
Albuquerque Vet Center	Albuquerque	NM	VC
Amarillo Vet Center	Amarillo	TX	VC
Chinle Vet Center Outstation	Chinle	AZ	VC
El Paso Vet Center	El Paso	TX	VC
Farmington Vet Center Satellite	Farmington	NM	VC
Hopi Vet Center Outstation 2	Hotevilla	AZ	VC
Las Cruces Vet Center	Las Cruces	NM	VC
Lubbock Vet Center	Lubbock	TX	VC
Mesa Vet Center	Mesa	AZ	VC
Midland Vet Center	Midland	TX	VC
Phoenix Vet Center	Phoenix	AZ	VC
Prescott Vet Center	Prescott	AZ	VC
Santa Fe Vet Center	Santa Fe	NM	VC
Tucson Vet Center	Tucson	AZ	VC

=== VISN 19: VA Rocky Mountain Network ===
Headquarters: Glendale, Colorado

Facility	City	State	Type
VA Eastern Colorado Health Care System (ECHCS)	Denver	CO	HCS
VA Montana Health Care System	Fort Harrison	MT	HCS
VA Salt Lake City Health Care System	Salt Lake City	UT	HCS
Cheyenne VA Medical	Cheyenne	WY	VAMC
Grand Junction VA Medical Center	Grand Junction	CO	VAMC
Sheridan VA Medical Center	Sheridan	WY	VAMC
Burlington VA Outreach Clinic	Burlington	CO	IOC
Fountain Green Clinic	Fountain Green	UT	IOC
Havre Outreach Clinic	Havre	MT	IOC
Alamosa /San Luis Valley Clinic/Sierra Blanca Medical Center	Alamosa	CO	CBOC
Anaconda Outpatient Clinic	Anaconda	MT	CBOC
Aurora Outpatient Clinic	Aurora	CO	CBOC
Billings Outpatient Clinic	Billings	MT	CBOC
Bozeman Outpatient Clinic	Bozeman	MT	CBOC
Casper Outpatient Clinic	Casper	WY	CBOC
Colorado Springs Clinic	Colorado Springs	CO	CBOC
Craig CBOC	Craig	CO	CBOC
Cut Bank Outpatient Clinic	Cut Bank	MT	CBOC
Elko Outreach Clinic	Elko	NV	CBOC
Ely CBOC	Ely	NV	CBOC
Fort Collins Outpatient Clinic	Fort Collins	CO	CBOC
Gillette Outpatient Clinic	Gillette	WY	CBOC
Glasgow Outpatient Clinic	Glasgow	MT	CBOC
Glendive CBOC	Glendive	MT	CBOC
Great Falls Outpatient Clinic	Great Falls	MT	CBOC
Greeley Outpatient Clinic	Greeley	CO	CBOC
Kalispell Outpatient Clinic	Kalispell	MT	CBOC
La Junta Outpatient Clinic	La Junta	CO	CBOC
Lakewood Outpatient Clinic	Lakewood	CO	CBOC
Lamar Outpatient Clinic	Lamar	CO	CBOC
Lewistown Primary Care Clinic	Lewistown	MT	CBOC
Miles City Outpatient Clinic / Nursing Home	Miles City	MT	CBOC
Missoula Outpatient Clinic	Missoula	MT	CBOC
Montrose Outpatient Clinic	Montrose	CO	CBOC
Nephi CBOC	Nephi	UT	CBOC
Ogden CBOC	South Ogden	UT	CBOC
Orem CBOC	Orem	UT	CBOC
Pocatello CBOC	Pocatello	ID	CBOC
Powell Outpatient Clinic	Powell	WY	CBOC
Pueblo Outpatient Clinic	Pueblo	CO	CBOC
Riverton Outpatient Clinic	Riverton	WY	CBOC
Rock Springs Outpatient Clinic	Rock Springs	WY	CBOC
Roosevelt CBOC	Roosevelt	UT	CBOC
Sidney Outpatient Clinic (Nebraska)	Sidney	NE	CBOC
St. George CBOC	St. George	UT	CBOC
Western Salt Lake CBOC	West Valley City	UT	CBOC
Western Mountain Regional Office	Denver	CO	VC
Billings Vet Center	Billings	MT	VC
Boulder Vet Center	Boulder	CO	VC
Casper Vet Center (Satellite)	Casper	WY	VC
Cheyenne Vet Center	Cheyenne	WY	VC
Colorado Springs Vet Center	Colorado Springs	CO	VC
Denver Vet Center	Denver	CO	VC
Fort Collins Vet Center Outstation	Fort Collins	CO	VC
Grand Junction Vet Center	Grand Junction	CO	VC
Missoula Vet Center	Missoula	MT	VC
Pocatello Vet Center	Pocatello	ID	VC
Provo Vet Center	Provo	UT	VC
Pueblo Vet Center (Satellite)	Pueblo	CO	VC
Salt Lake Vet Center	Salt Lake City	UT	VC

=== VISN 20: VA Northwest Network ===
Headquarters: Vancouver, Washington

Facility	City	State	Type
VA Puget Sound HCS American Lake Division	Tacoma	WA	VAMC
VA Puget Sound Health Care System	Seattle	WA	VAMC
VA Roseburg Healthcare System	Roseburg	OR	VAMC
Boise VA Medical Center	Boise	ID	VAMC
Jonathan M. Wainwright Memorial VA Medical Center – Walla Walla	Walla Walla	WA	VAMC
Portland VA Medical Center	Portland	OR	VAMC
Portland VA Medical Center – Vancouver Campus	Vancouver	WA	VAMC
Spokane VA Medical Center	Spokane	WA	VAMC
VA Southern Oregon Rehabilitation Center & Clinics	White City	OR	REHAB
Burns OPC (Extension Clinic)	Burns	OR	IOC
The Dalles OPC	The Dalles	OR	IOC
Colonel Mary Louise Rasmuson Campus of the Alaska VA Healthcare System	Anchorage	AK	IOC
Bend CBOC	Bend	OR	CBOC
Bremerton CBOC	Bremerton	WA	CBOC
Brookings CBOC	Brookings	OR	CBOC
Caldwell Clinic	Caldwell	ID	CBOC
Coeur d 'Alene CBOC	Coeur d'Alene	ID	CBOC
East Portland CBOC	Portland	OR	CBOC
Eugene CBOC	Eugene	OR	CBOC
Fairbanks VA Community Based Outpatient Clinic	Fort Wainwright	AK	CBOC
Hillsboro CBOC	Hillsboro	OR	CBOC
Kenai VA Community Based Outpatient Clinic	Kenai	AK	CBOC
Klamath Falls CBOC	Klamath Falls	OR	CBOC
La Grande Community Based Outpatient Clinic	La Grande	OR	CBOC
Lewiston Idaho CBOC	Lewiston	ID	CBOC
Mat-Su VA Community Based Outpatient Clinic	Wasilla	AK	CBOC
Mount Vernon CBOC	Mount Vernon	WA	CBOC
North Bend CBOC	North Bend	OR	CBOC
North Coast CBOC	Warrenton	OR	CBOC
Port Angeles	Port Angeles	WA	CBOC
Richland Community Based Outpatient Clinic	Richland	WA	CBOC
Salem CBOC	Salem	OR	CBOC
Twin Falls Outpatient Clinic	Twin Falls	ID	CBOC
Valor CBOC Bellevue	Bellevue	WA	CBOC
Valor CBOC Federal Way	Federal Way	WA	CBOC
Valor CBOC North Seattle	Seattle	WA	CBOC
Wenatchee CBOC	Wenatchee	WA	CBOC
Yakima Community Based Outpatient Clinic (CBOC)	Yakima	WA	CBOC
Ontario Oregon CBOC	Ontario	OR	CBOC
Anchorage Vet Center	Anchorage	AK	VC
Bellingham Vet Center	Bellingham	WA	VC
Boise Vet Center	Boise	ID	VC
Eugene Vet Center	Eugene	OR	VC
Everett Vet Center	Everett	WA	VC
Fairbanks Vet Center	Fairbanks	AK	VC
Grants Pass Vet Center	Grants Pass	OR	VC
Kenai Vet Center Satellite	Soldotna	AK	VC
Portland Vet Center	Portland	OR	VC
Salem Vet Center	Salem	OR	VC
Seattle Vet Center	Seattle	WA	VC
Spokane Vet Center	Spokane	WA	VC
Tacoma Vet Center	Tacoma	WA	VC
Wasilla Vet Center	Wasilla	AK	VC
Yakima Valley Vet Center Integrated Clinical Facility	Yakima	WA	VC

=== VISN 21: VA Sierra Pacific Network ===
Headquarters: Mare Island, California

Facility	City	State	Type
Livermore Division Medical Center	Livermore	CA	VAMC
Menlo Park Division Medical Center	Menlo Park	CA	VAMC
San Francisco VA Medical Center	San Francisco	CA	VAMC
VA Central California Health Care System	Fresno	CA	VAMC
VA Northern California Health Care System	Mather	CA	VAMC
VA Pacific Islands Health Care System	Honolulu	HI	VAMC
VA Palo Alto Health Care System	Palo Alto	CA	VAMC
VA Sierra Nevada Health Care System	Reno	NV	VAMC
Capitola Clinic	Capitola	CA	IOC
Castle Mental Health OPC	Atwater	CA	IOC
Chico Outpatient Clinic	Chico	CA	IOC
Eureka Veterans Clinic	Eureka	CA	IOC
Fairfield Outpatient Clinic	Fairfield	CA	IOC
Manila Outpatient Clinic	Pasay	PI	IOC
Mare Island Outpatient Clinic	Vallejo	CA	IOC
Martinez Outpatient Clinic and Community Living Center	Martinez	CA	IOC
McClellan Dental Clinic – Sacramento	McClellan	CA	IOC
McClellan Outpatient Clinic – Sacramento	McClellan	CA	IOC
Modesto Clinic	Modesto	CA	IOC
Monterey Clinic	Seaside	CA	IOC
National Center for PTSD – Pacific Islands Division	Honolulu	HI	IOC
Oakland Behavioral Health Clinic	Oakland	CA	IOC
Oakland Outpatient Clinic	Oakland	CA	IOC
Redding Outpatient Clinic	Redding	CA	IOC
Sacramento Mental Health Clinic at Mather	Mather	CA	IOC
San Jose Clinic	San Jose	CA	IOC
Santa Rosa Clinic	Santa Rosa	CA	IOC
San Francisco VAMC Downtown Clinic	San Francisco	CA	IOC
Sierra Foothills Outpatient Clinic	Auburn	CA	IOC
Sonora Clinic	Sonora	CA	IOC
Stockton Clinic	French Camp	CA	IOC
Tulare Community Based Outpatient Clinic	Tulare	CA	IOC
Ukiah Community Based Outpatient Clinic	Ukiah	CA	IOC
American Samoa CBOC	Pago Pago	AS	CBOC
Carson Valley Community Based Outpatient Clinic	Minden	NV	CBOC
Daniel K. Akaka Community Based Outpatient Clinic	Kapolei	HI	CBOC
Diamond View Outpatient Clinic	Susanville	CA	CBOC
Fremont Clinic	Fremont	CA	CBOC
Guam Community Based Outpatient Clinic	Agana Heights	GU	CBOC
Hilo Community Based Outpatient Clinic	Hilo	HI	CBOC
Kauai Community Based Outpatient Clinic	Lihue	HI	CBOC
Kona Community Based Outpatient Clinic	Kailua-Kona	HI	CBOC
Lahontan Valley Outpatient Clinic	Fallon	NV	CBOC
Maui Community Based Outpatient Clinic	Kahului	HI	CBOC
Merced Community Based Outpatient Clinic	Merced	CA	CBOC
San Bruno Outpatient Clinic	San Bruno	CA	CBOC
4B Pacific Western Regional Office	Fairfield	CA	VC
Chico Vet Center	Chico	CA	VC
Concord Vet Center	Concord	CA	VC
Eureka Vet Center	Eureka	CA	VC
Fresno Vet Center	Fresno	CA	VC
Guam Vet Center	Hagatna	GU	VC
Hilo Vet Center	Hilo	HI	VC
Honolulu Vet Center	Honolulu	HI	VC
Kailua-Kona Vet Center	Kailua-Kona	HI	VC
Kauai Vet Center	Lihue	HI	VC
Maui Vet Center	Wailuku	HI	VC
Modesto Vet Center	Modesto	CA	VC
Northbay Vet Center	Rohnert Park	CA	VC
Oakland Vet Center	Oakland	CA	VC
Peninsula Vet Center	Redwood City	CA	VC
Reno Vet Center	Reno	NV	VC
Sacramento Vet Center	Sacramento	CA	VC
San Francisco Vet Center	San Francisco	CA	VC
San Jose Vet Center	San Jose	CA	VC
Santa Cruz County Vet Center	Capitola	CA	VC

=== VISN 22: VA Desert Pacific Healthcare Network ===
Headquarters: Long Beach, California

Facility	City	State	Type
VA Greater Los Angeles Healthcare System (GLA)	Los Angeles	CA	VAMC
VA Loma Linda Healthcare System	Loma Linda	CA	VAMC
VA Long Beach Healthcare System	Long Beach	CA	VAMC
VA San Diego Healthcare System	San Diego	CA	VAMC
VA Southern Nevada Healthcare System (VASNHS)	Las Vegas	NV	VAMC
Mike O'Callaghan Federal Hospital	Nellis AFB	NV	VADOD
Los Angeles Ambulatory Care Center	Los Angeles	CA	IOC
Mission Valley	San Diego	CA	IOC
Sepulveda OPC and Nursing Home	North Hills	CA	IOC
VA West Los Angeles Healthcare Center	Los Angeles	CA	IOC
Anaheim	Anaheim	CA	CBOC
Bakersfield Community Based Outpatient Clinic	Bakersfield	CA	CBOC
Chula Vista (South Bay)	Chula Vista	CA	CBOC
Community Based Outreach Center for Homeless Veterans (MASH)	Las Vegas	NV	CBOC
Corona	Corona	CA	CBOC
East Clinic/Las Vegas	Las Vegas	NV	CBOC
East Los Angeles	Commerce	CA	CBOC
Escondido	Escondido	CA	CBOC
Gardena	Gardena	CA	CBOC
Henderson Community Based Outpatient Clinic	Henderson	NV	CBOC
Imperial Valley	El Centro	CA	CBOC
Laguna Hills	Laguna Hills	CA	CBOC
Lancaster Community Based Outpatient Clinic	Lancaster	CA	CBOC
Northwest Clinic	Las Vegas	NV	CBOC
Oxnard	Oxnard	CA	CBOC
Pahrump Community Based Outpatient Clinic	Pahrump	NV	CBOC
Palm Desert	Palm Desert	CA	CBOC
Pasadena	San Gabriel	CA	CBOC
Rancho Cucamonga	Rancho Cucamonga	CA	CBOC
San Luis Obispo – Pacific Medical Plaza	San Luis Obispo	CA	CBOC
Santa Ana – Bristol Medical Center	Santa Ana	CA	CBOC
Santa Barbara Community Based Outpatient Clinic	Santa Barbara	CA	CBOC
Santa Maria Community Based Outpatient Clinic	Santa Maria	CA	CBOC
Southwest Clinic	Las Vegas	NV	CBOC
Sun City	Sun City	CA	CBOC
Ventura CBOC	Ventura	CA	CBOC
Victorville	Victorville	CA	CBOC
Villages at Cabrillo	Long Beach	CA	CBOC
Vista	Vista	CA	CBOC
West Clinic	Las Vegas	NV	CBOC
Whittier/Santa Fe Springs Clinic	Santa Fe Springs	CA	CBOC
Antelope Valley Vet Center	Palmdale	CA	VC
Corona Vet Center	Corona	CA	VC
East Los Angeles Vet Center	Commerce	CA	VC
Henderson Vet Center	Henderson	NV	VC
High Desert Vet Center	Victorville	CA	VC
Las Vegas Vet Center	Las Vegas	NV	VC
Los Angeles Veterans Resource Center	Gardena	CA	VC
North Orange County Vet Center	Garden Grove	CA	VC
San Bernardino Vet Center	Colton	CA	VC
San Diego Vet Center	San Diego	CA	VC
San Marcos Vet Center	San Marcos	CA	VC
Sepulveda Vet Center	Sepulveda	CA	VC
South Orange County Vet Center	Mission Viejo	CA	VC
Temecula Vet Center	Temecula	CA	VC
Ventura Vet Center	Ventura	CA	VC
West Los Angeles Vet Center	Culver City	CA	VC

=== VISN 23: VA Midwest Health Care Network ===
Headquarters: Minneapolis, Minnesota and Lincoln, Nebraska

Facility	City	State	Type
Des Moines Division – VA Central Iowa Health Care System	Des Moines	IA	VAMC
Fargo VA Medical Center	Fargo	ND	VAMC
Iowa City VA Medical Center	Iowa City	IA	VAMC
Minneapolis VA Health Care System	Minneapolis	MN	VAMC
Omaha – VA Nebraska-Western Iowa Health Care System	Omaha	NE	VAMC
Sioux Falls VA Medical Center	Sioux Falls	SD	VAMC
St. Cloud VA Health Care System	St. Cloud	MN	VAMC
VA Black Hills Health Care System – Hot Springs Campus	Hot Springs	SD	VAMC
VA Black Hills Health Care System – Fort Meade Campus	Fort Meade	SD	VAMC
Cedar Rapids CBOC	Cedar Rapids	IA	IOC
Coralville OPC	Coralville	IA	IOC
Dickinson VA Outpatient Clinic	Dickinson	ND	IOC
Jamestown VA Outpatient Clinic	Jamestown	ND	IOC
Aberdeen VA Clinic	Aberdeen	SD	CBOC
Alexandria Community Based Outpatient Clinic	Alexandria	MN	CBOC
Alliance VA Clinic	Alliance	NE	CBOC
Bellevue CBOC	Bellevue	NE	CBOC
Bemidji CBOC	Bemidji	MN	CBOC
Bettendorf VA Clinic	Bettendorf	IA	CBOC
Bismarck VA Clinic	Bismarck	ND	CBOC
Brainerd VA Clinic	Brainerd	MN	CBOC
Chippewa Valley VA Clinic	Chippewa Falls	WI	CBOC
Dubuque VA Clinic	Dubuque	IA	CBOC
Eagle Butte VA Clinic	Eagle Butte	SD	CBOC
Faith Community Based Outpatient Clinic	Eagle Butte	SD	CBOC
Fergus Falls VA Clinic	Fergus Falls	MN	CBOC
Fort Dodge VA Clinic	Fort Dodge	IA	CBOC
Galesburg VA Clinic	Galesburg	IL	CBOC
Gordon VA Community Based Outpatient Clinic	Gordon	NE	CBOC
Grafton VA Clinic	Grafton	ND	CBOC
Grand Island CBOC	Grand Island	NE	CBOC
Hayward VA Clinic	Hayward	WI	CBOC
Hibbing VA Clinic	Hibbing	MN	CBOC
Holdrege CBOC	Holdrege	NE	CBOC
Isabel Community Based Outpatient Clinic	Eagle Butte	SD	CBOC
Knoxville VA Clinic	Knoxville	IA	CBOC
Lincoln CBOC	Lincoln	NE	CBOC
Mankato CBOC	Mankato	MN	CBOC
Maplewood VA Clinic	Maplewood	MN	CBOC
Mason City VA Clinic	Mason City	IA	CBOC
McLaughlin VA Clinic	McLaughlin	SD	CBOC
Minot VA Clinic	Minot	ND	CBOC
Mission CBOC	Mission	SD	CBOC
Montevideo VA Clinic	Montevideo	MN	CBOC
Newcastle VA Clinic	Newcastle	WY	CBOC
Norfolk CBOC	Norfolk	NE	CBOC
North Platte CBOC	North Platte	NE	CBOC
Pierre VA Clinic	Pierre	SD	CBOC
Pine Ridge VA Clinic	Pine Ridge	SD	CBOC
Quincy VA Clinic	Quincy	IL	CBOC
Rapid City VA Clinic	Rapid City	SD	CBOC
Rice Lake VA Clinic	Rice Lake	WI	CBOC
Rochester VA Clinic	Rochester	MN	CBOC
Rushville VA Clinic	Rushville	NE	CBOC
Scottsbluff CBOC	Scottsbluff	NE	CBOC
Shenandoah CBOC	Shenandoah	IA	CBOC
Sioux City VA Clinic	Sioux City	IA	CBOC
South Central VA Clinic (St James)	St. James	MN	CBOC
Spirit Lake VA Clinic	Spirit Lake	IA	CBOC
Twin Ports VA Clinic	Superior	WI	CBOC
Waterloo VA Clinic	Waterloo	IA	CBOC
Watertown CBOC	Watertown	SD	CBOC
Williston	Williston	ND	CBOC
Winner VA Clinic	Winner	SD	CBOC
Bismarck Vet Center Outstation	Bismarck	ND	VC
Brooklyn Park Vet Center	Brooklyn Park	MN	VC
Cedar Rapids Vet Center Satellite	Cedar Rapids	IA	VC
Des Moines Vet Center	Des Moines	IA	VC
Duluth Vet Center	Duluth	MN	VC
Fargo Vet Center	Fargo	ND	VC
Lincoln Vet Center	Lincoln	NE	VC
Minot Vet Center	Minot	ND	VC
Omaha Vet Center	Omaha	NE	VC
Pine Ridge Vet Center Outstation	Martin	SD	VC
Quad Cities Vet Center	Moline	IL	VC
Rapid City Vet Center	Rapid City	SD	VC
Sioux City Vet Center	Sioux City	IA	VC
Sioux Falls Vet Center	Sioux Falls	SD	VC
St. Paul Veterans Resource Center	New Brighton	MN	VC

== List of Veterans Affairs medical facilities by state ==
in
