= Oscar G. Johnson =

US Army medal of honor recipient

Oscar G. Johnson Jr.
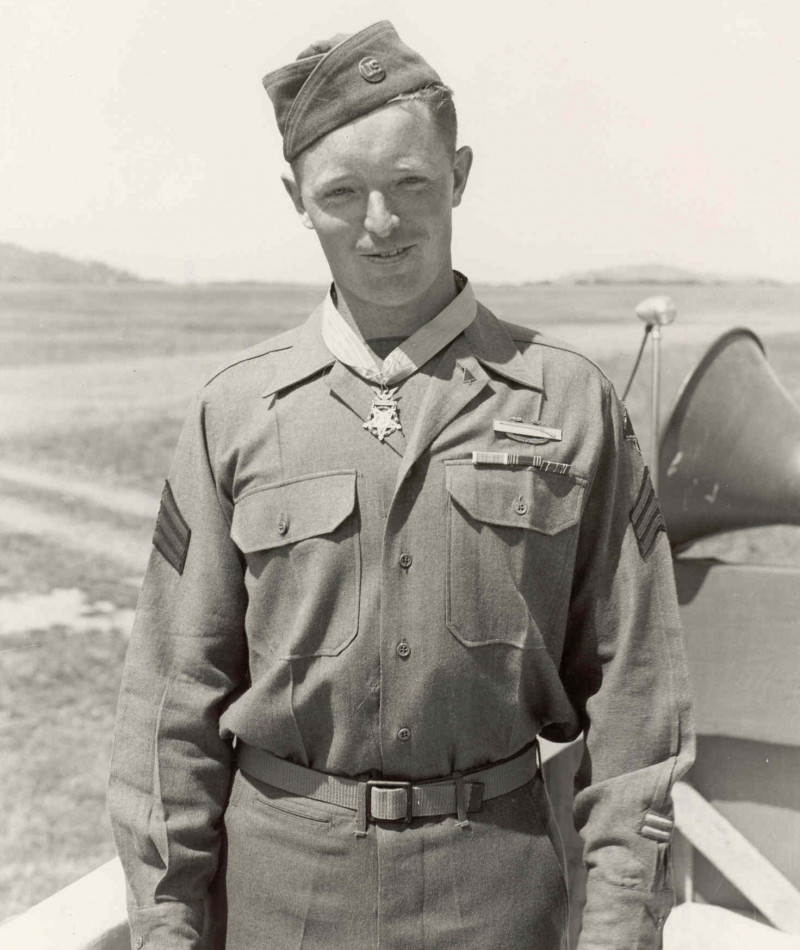
- Oscar G. Johnson, Jr. after having been presented with the Medal of Honor in 1945
- Born: March 25, 1921; Foster City, Michigan, US
- Died: May 13, 1998 (aged 77); DeWitt, Michigan, US
- Burial place: DeWitt Cemetery, DeWitt, Michigan
- Military career
- Allegiance: United States of America
- Branch: United States Army
- Service years: 1942 – 1945, 1959 – 1964
- Rank: Chief Warrant Officer Four
- Units: 1st Battalion, 363rd Infantry Regiment, 91st Infantry Division
- Conflicts: World War II
- Awards: Medal of Honor

Oscar Godfrey Johnson Jr. (March 25, 1921 – May 13, 1998) was a United States Army soldier and a recipient of the United States military's highest decoration—the Medal of Honor—for his actions in World War II.

== Biography ==
Johnson joined the Army from his birthplace of Foster City, Michigan in October 1942, and by September 16, 1944 was serving as a private first class in Company B, 363rd Infantry Regiment, 91st Infantry Division. On that day, and for the following two days, near Scarperia, Italy, he single-handedly held his position at his unit's left flank after all the other members of his squad had been killed or wounded. He was subsequently promoted to sergeant and, on June 25, 1945, awarded the Medal of Honor by General Mark W. Clark in Gorizia, Italy.

Johnson later joined the Michigan National Guard in July 1959, and reached the rank of Chief Warrant Officer Four before his discharge in April 1964. He died at age 77 and was buried in DeWitt Cemetery, De Witt, Michigan.

== Medal of Honor citation ==
Johnson's official Medal of Honor citation reads:

He practically single-handed protected the left flank of his company's position in the offensive to break the German's gothic line. Company B was the extreme left assault unit of the corps. The advance was stopped by heavy fire from Monticelli Ridge, and the company took cover behind an embankment. Sgt. Johnson, a mortar gunner, having expended his ammunition, assumed the duties of a rifleman. As leader of a squad of 7 men he was ordered to establish a combat post 50 yards to the left of the company to cover its exposed flank. Repeated enemy counterattacks, supported by artillery, mortar, and machinegun fire from the high ground to his front, had by the afternoon of 16 September killed or wounded all his men. Collecting weapons and ammunition from his fallen comrades, in the face of hostile fire, he held his exposed position and inflicted heavy casualties upon the enemy, who several times came close enough to throw hand grenades. On the night of 16–17 September, the enemy launched his heaviest attack on Company B, putting his greatest pressure against the lone defender of the left flank. In spite of mortar fire which crashed about him and machinegun bullets which whipped the crest of his shallow trench, Sgt. Johnson stood erect and repulsed the attack with grenades and small arms fire. He remained awake and on the alert throughout the night, frustrating all attempts at infiltration. On 17 September, 25 German soldiers surrendered to him. Two men, sent to reinforce him that afternoon, were caught in a devastating mortar and artillery barrage. With no thought of his own safety, Sgt. Johnson rushed to the shell hole where they lay half buried and seriously wounded, covered their position by his fire, and assisted a Medical Corpsman by the name of James L. Christopher from Mount Vernon, Ohio in rendering aid. That night he secured their removal to the rear and remained on watch until his company was relieved. Five companies of a German paratroop regiment had been repeatedly committed to the attack on Company B without success. Twenty dead Germans were found in front of his position. By his heroic stand and utter disregard for personal safety, Sgt. Johnson was in a large measure responsible for defeating the enemy's attempts to turn the exposed left flank.

== Awards and decorations ==

Badge	Combat Infantryman Badge		
1st row	Medal of Honor	Bronze Star Medal	
2nd row	Purple Heart	Army Good Conduct Medal	American Campaign Medal
3rd row	European–African–Middle Eastern Campaign Medal with three campaign stars	World War II Victory Medal	National Defense Service Medal

== Legacy ==
The Oscar G. Johnson VA Medical Center in Iron Mountain, Michigan is named in his honor. A 46-mile section of Michigan Highway M-69 running through Foster City was renamed the Oscar G. Johnson Memorial Highway. The 91st Division Training Support Headquarters in Dublin, California, was dedicated in his memory on July 15, 2000.

== See also ==
- List of Medal of Honor recipients
- List of Medal of Honor recipients for World War II
