= Bedford Veterans Affairs Medical Center =

Edith Nourse Rogers Memorial Veterans Hospital
- United States Department of Veterans Affairs

Geography
- Location: Bedford, Massachusetts, United States
- Coordinates: 42°30′19″N 71°16′15″W

Services
- Emergency department: No

History
- Constructed: 1928
- Opened: 1928

Links
- Website: www.va.gov/bedford-health-care/locations/edith-nourse-rogers-memorial-veterans-hospital/
- Lists: Hospitals in Massachusetts
- Bedford Veterans Administration Hospital Historic District
- U.S. National Register of Historic Places
- U.S. Historic district
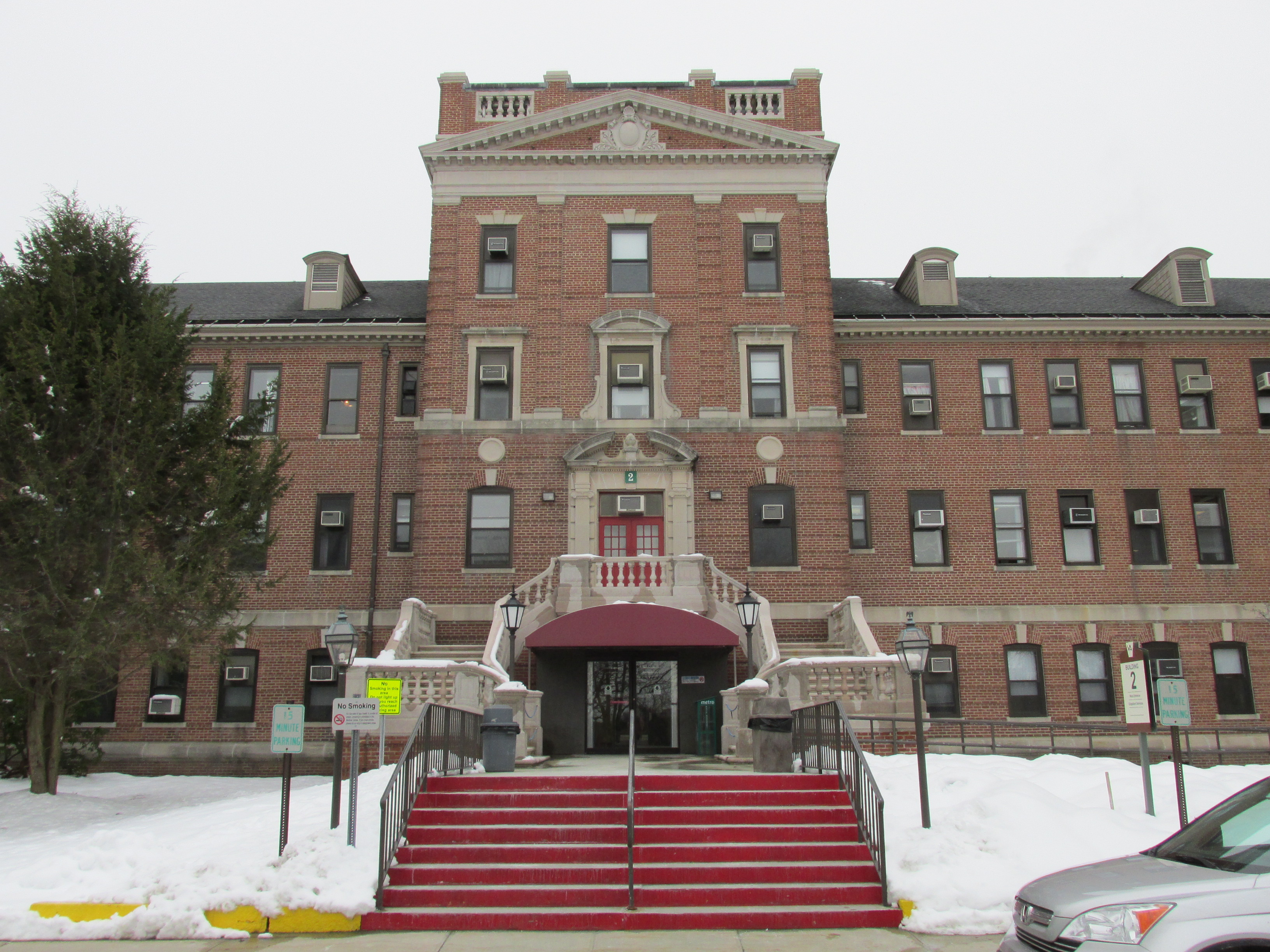
- Building 2

- Location within Massachusetts Location within the United States
- Location: Bedford, Massachusetts
- Built: 1928
- NRHP reference No.: 12000977
- Added to NRHP: November 28, 2012

The Bedford Veterans Affairs Medical Center, also known as the Edith Nourse Rogers Memorial Veterans Hospital, is a medical facility of the United States Department of Veterans Affairs (VA) at 200 Springs Road in Bedford, Massachusetts. Its campus once consisted of about 276 acres (112 ha) of land, which had by 2012 been reduced to 179 acres (72 ha). The hospital was opened in 1928 to treat neuropsychiatric patients, but now provides a wider array of medical services. Through the efforts of Congresswoman Edith Nourse Rogers, the center was expanded to offer services to women in 1947; her role led to the center being renamed in her honor by President Jimmy Carter.

The focal point of the complex is its Main Building, a three-story brick Classical Revival building that was built in 1928, and is still used as a medical care facility. South of this is the Administration building, also built in 1928. West of that is the former Kitchen and Dining Hall of 1928, which now houses offices and storage space. To its west is the 1929 Acute Care Building, now known as the Nursing Home Care Unit. Other buildings of the complex are located primarily north and south of this grouping, and are smaller in scale.

In 2012, 177 acres of the remaining campus were listed as a historic district on the National Register of Historic Places. The district includes the main hospital buildings, as well as residential housing, utility and maintenance buildings, most of which were built no later than 1947, and some of which date to 1928, the earliest period of the facility's construction. It is an excellent example of an intact Period 2 neuropsychiatric VA hospital.

== See also ==
- Northampton Veterans Affairs Medical Center
- National Register of Historic Places listings in Middlesex County, Massachusetts
- List of Veterans Affairs medical facilities
