= Fayetteville Veterans Administration Hospital =

- U.S. National Register of Historic Places
- U.S. Historic district
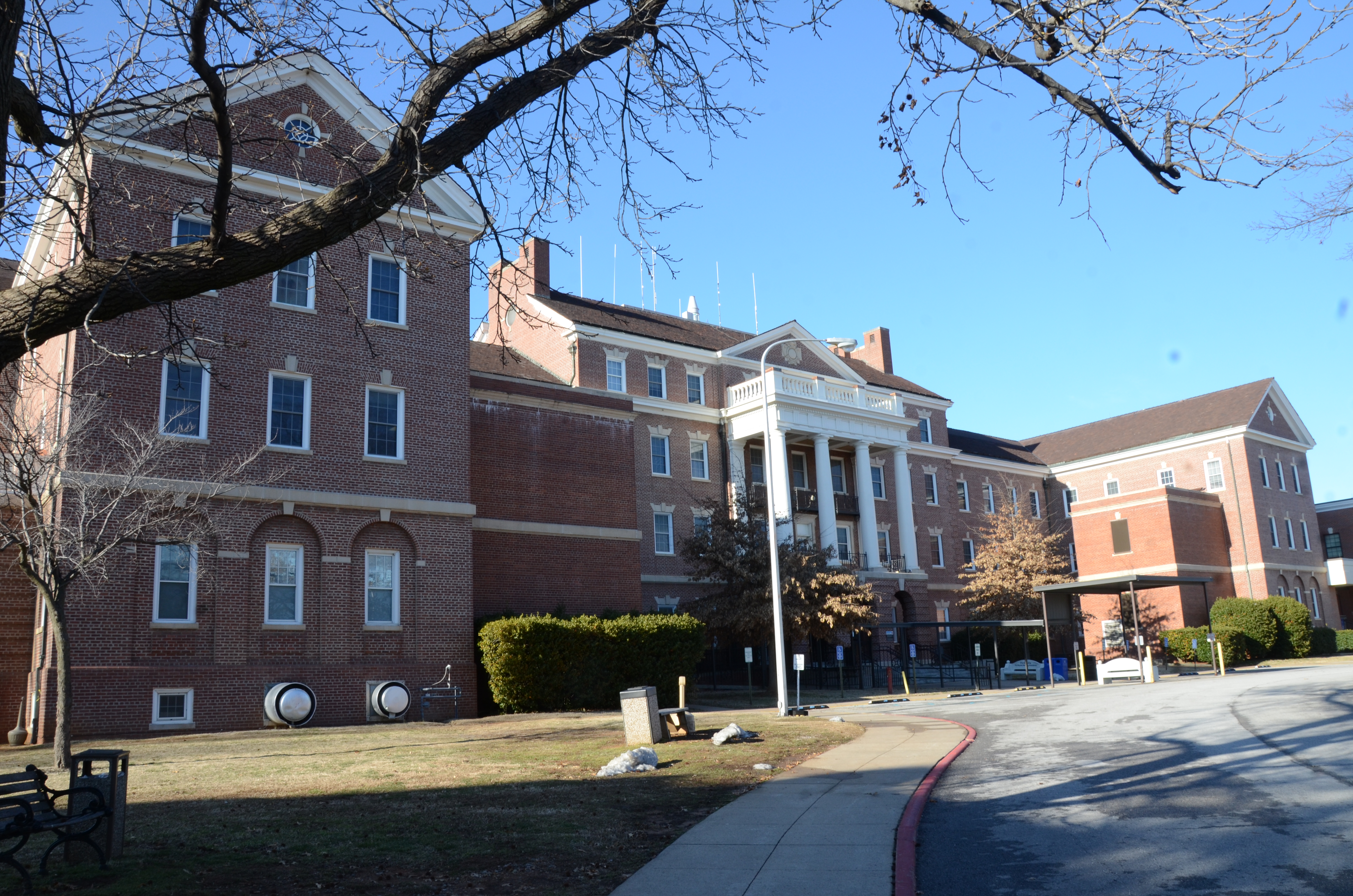

- Location within Arkansas Location within the United States
- Location: 1100 N. College Ave., Fayetteville, Arkansas
- Coordinates: 36°4′50″N 94°9′35″W
- Area: 46 acres (19 ha)
- Built: 1934
- NRHP reference No.: 12000024
- Added to NRHP: February 15, 2012

The Fayetteville Veterans Administration Hospital is a medical facility of the United States Department of Veterans Affairs at 1100 North College Avenue in Fayetteville, Arkansas. Set in a campus-like environment are a hospital and other care facilities, residences, and other utility buildings. The core of the complex, including its main hospital building, were built in 1934, and represent an architecturally cohesive collection of Colonial and Classical Revival buildings.

A 46-acre (19 ha) area of the facility was listed on the National Register of Historic Places in 2012.

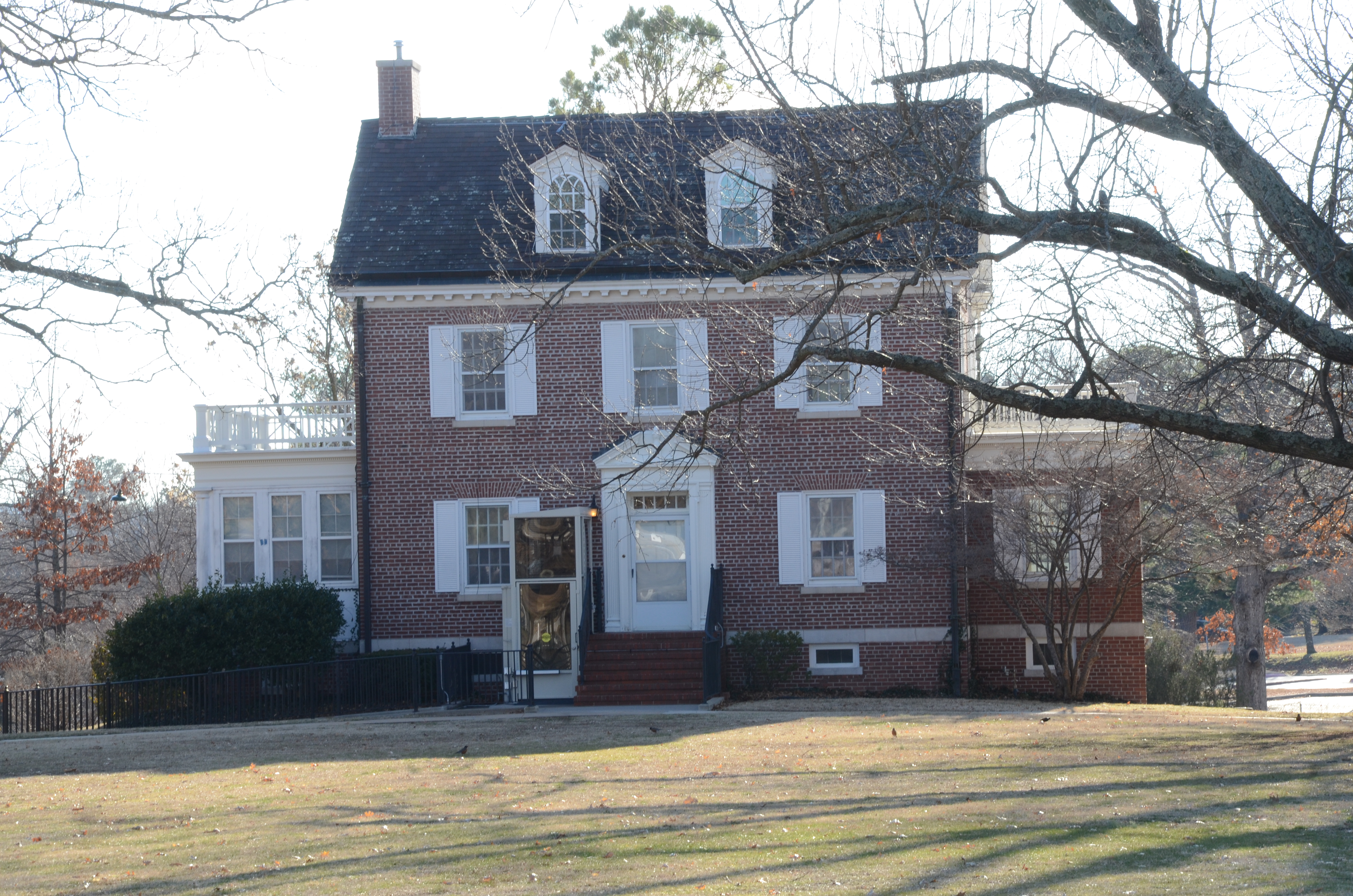
Fayetteville Veterans Administration Hospital Building

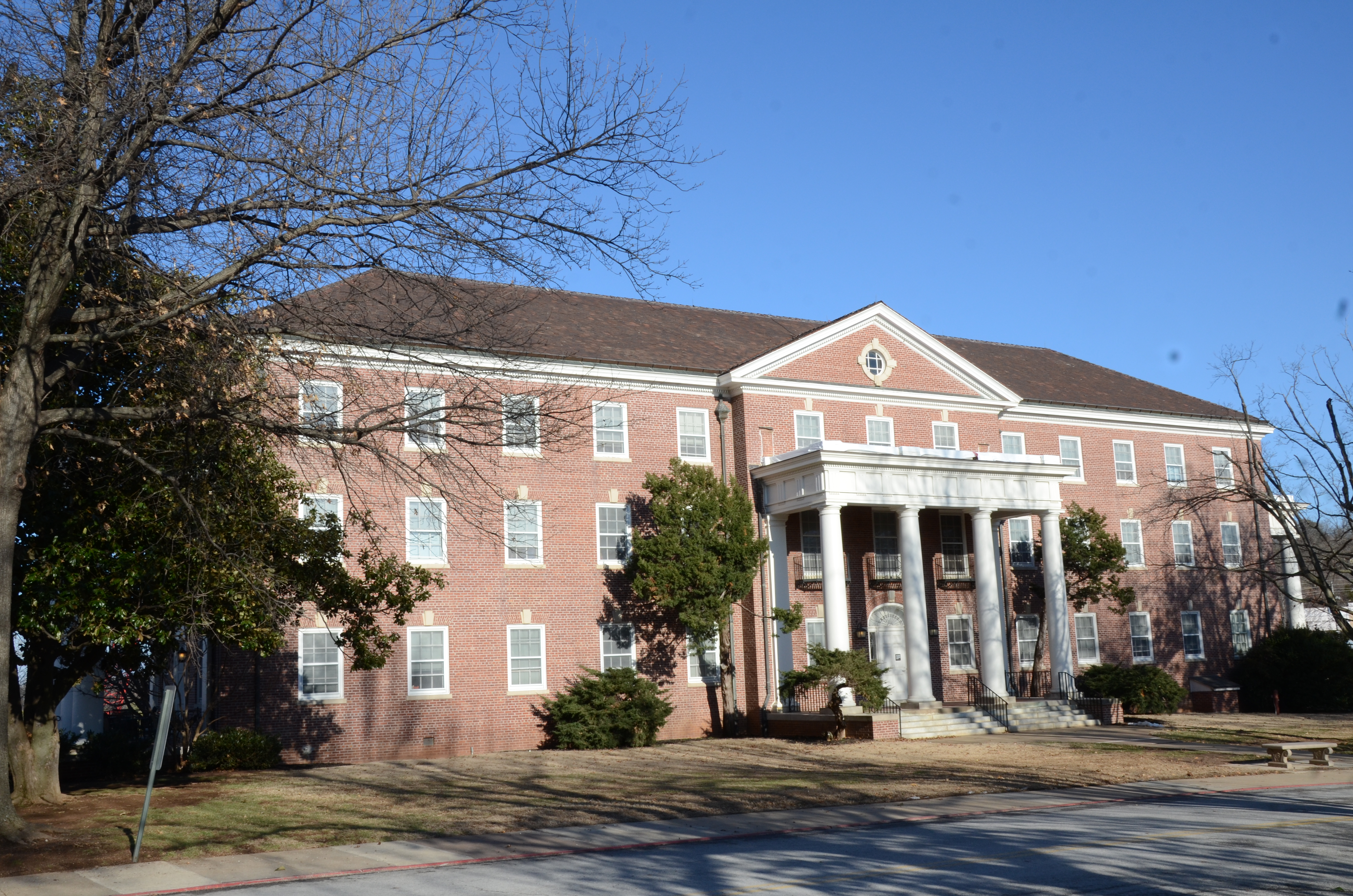
Fayetteville Veterans Administration Hospital Building

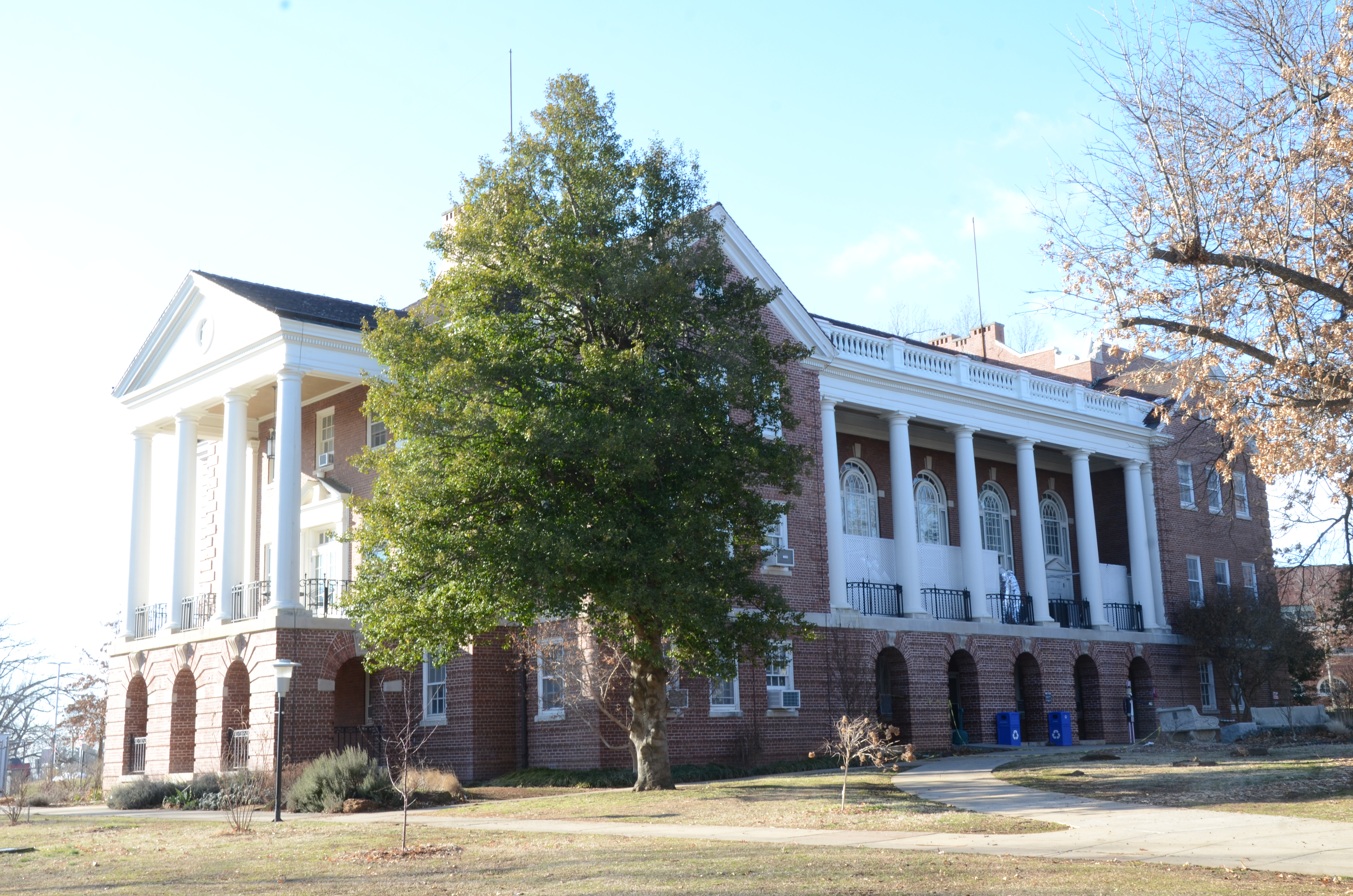
Fayetteville Veterans Administration Hospital Building

== See also ==
- National Register of Historic Places listings in Washington County, Arkansas
- List of Veterans Affairs medical facilities
