= Oscar G. Johnson VA Medical Center =

- Iron Mountain Veterans Administration (VA) Hospital
- U.S. National Register of Historic Places
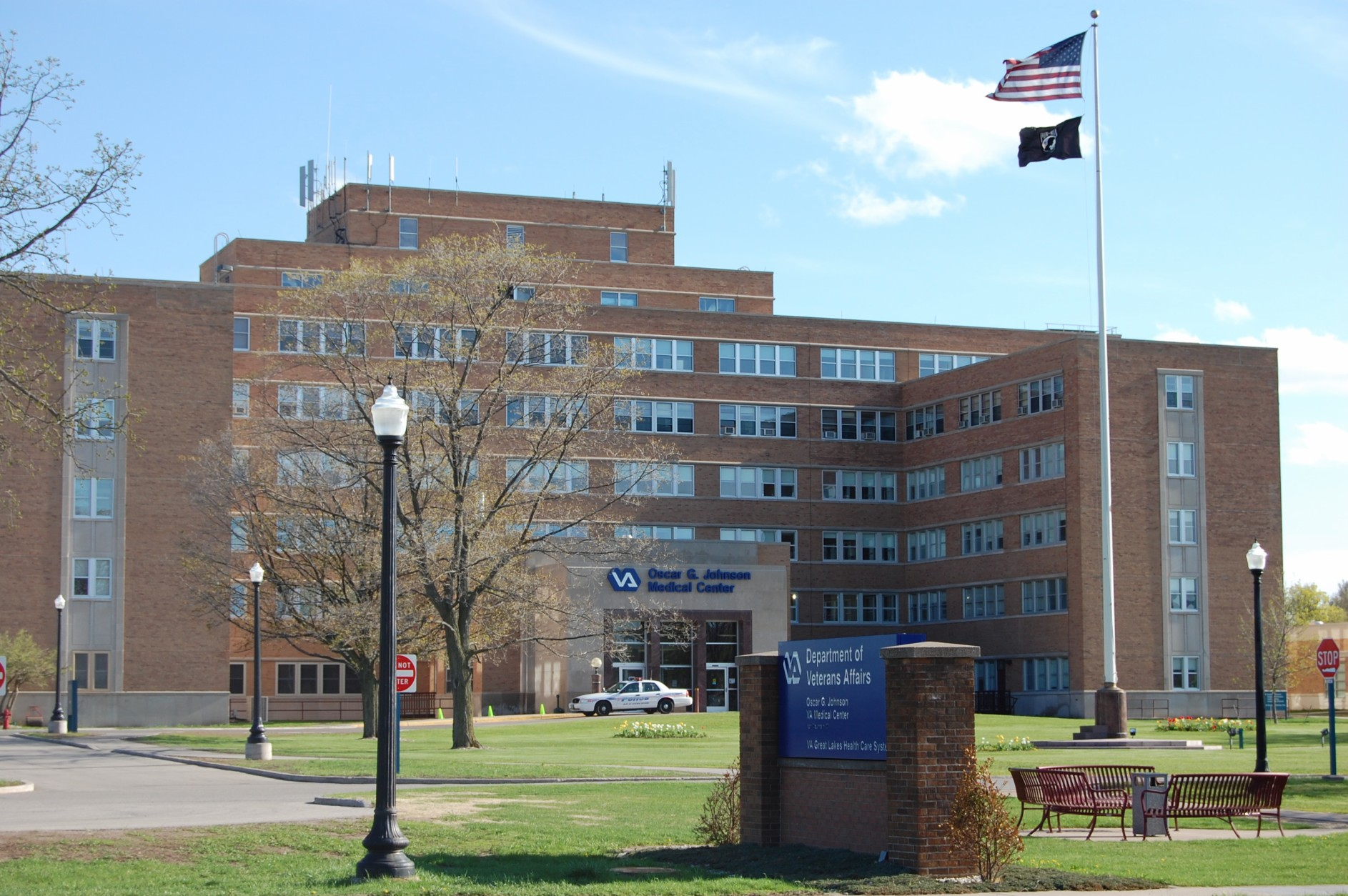
- VA Medical Center Main Hospital, 2009

- Location within Michigan Location within the United States
- Interactive map
- Location: 325 East H St., Iron Mountain, Michigan
- Coordinates: 45°48′37″N 88°3′42″W
- Built: 1948
- Built by: Gust K. Newberg Co., Proksch Construction Co.
- Architect: Fugard, Olsen, Urbain, and Neiler, Wallace G. Atkinson
- Architectural style: Modern Movement
- MPS: United States Third Generation Veterans Hospitals, 1946-1958 MPS
- NRHP reference No.: 100007870
- Added to NRHP: June 29, 2022

The Oscar G. Johnson VA Medical Center is a Veterans Administration hospital, opened in 1950. It is located at 325 East H Street in Iron Mountain, Michigan. The complex was listed on the National Register of Historic Places in 2022.

== History ==
As World War II came to a close, the need for veteran's healthcare increased in the western Upper Peninsula. In 1945, Iron Mountain was selected as the site for the construction of a new hospital. In 1946, the former Von Platen-Fox Lumber Company site was purchased as a location, and the Veterans Administration turned the project over to the United States Army Corps of Engineers to manage. The Corps hired the Chicago firm of Fugard, Olsen, Urbain, and Neiler to design the complex, and Wallace G. Atkinson to design the landscape. Plans were developed through 1947, and ground was finally broken at the site in March 1948. The Corps managed the construction through early 1950, transferring it back to the VA in February of that year. The Iron Mountain VA Hospital was dedicated on March 5, 1950.

The complex did not require any expansion for nearly 50 years. In 1997, an Ambulatory Care addition was constructed. Other small outbuildings were added in the early 2000s. In 2007, the hospital was renamed the Oscar G. Johnson Veterans Affairs Medical Center, after Dickinson County native and Medal of Honor recipient Oscar G. Johnson. In 2008, a new Rehabilitation and Extended Care Center/Community Living Center was constructed, and in 2011 the Outpatient Clinic was expanded.

== Description ==
The Oscar G. Johnson VA Medical Center consists of eight original buildings constructed in the late 1940s, and an additional eight smaller buildings dating from around 2000. The complex is situated on a 26.1-acre campus. The eight original building, as well as the design of the complex landscape, contribute to the historic quality of the site. The smaller buildings are non-contributing. The eight contributing buildings are:

- Main Hospital
- Power House, Garage, and Fire Department
- Attendants Quarters
- Manager's Quarters
- Duplex Apartments
- Nurses Quarters
- Flagpole
- Garage
