= Central Alabama VA Medical Center–Montgomery =

Hospital in Montgomery, Alabama

- Montgomery Veterans Administration Hospital Historic District
- U.S. National Register of Historic Places
- U.S. Historic district
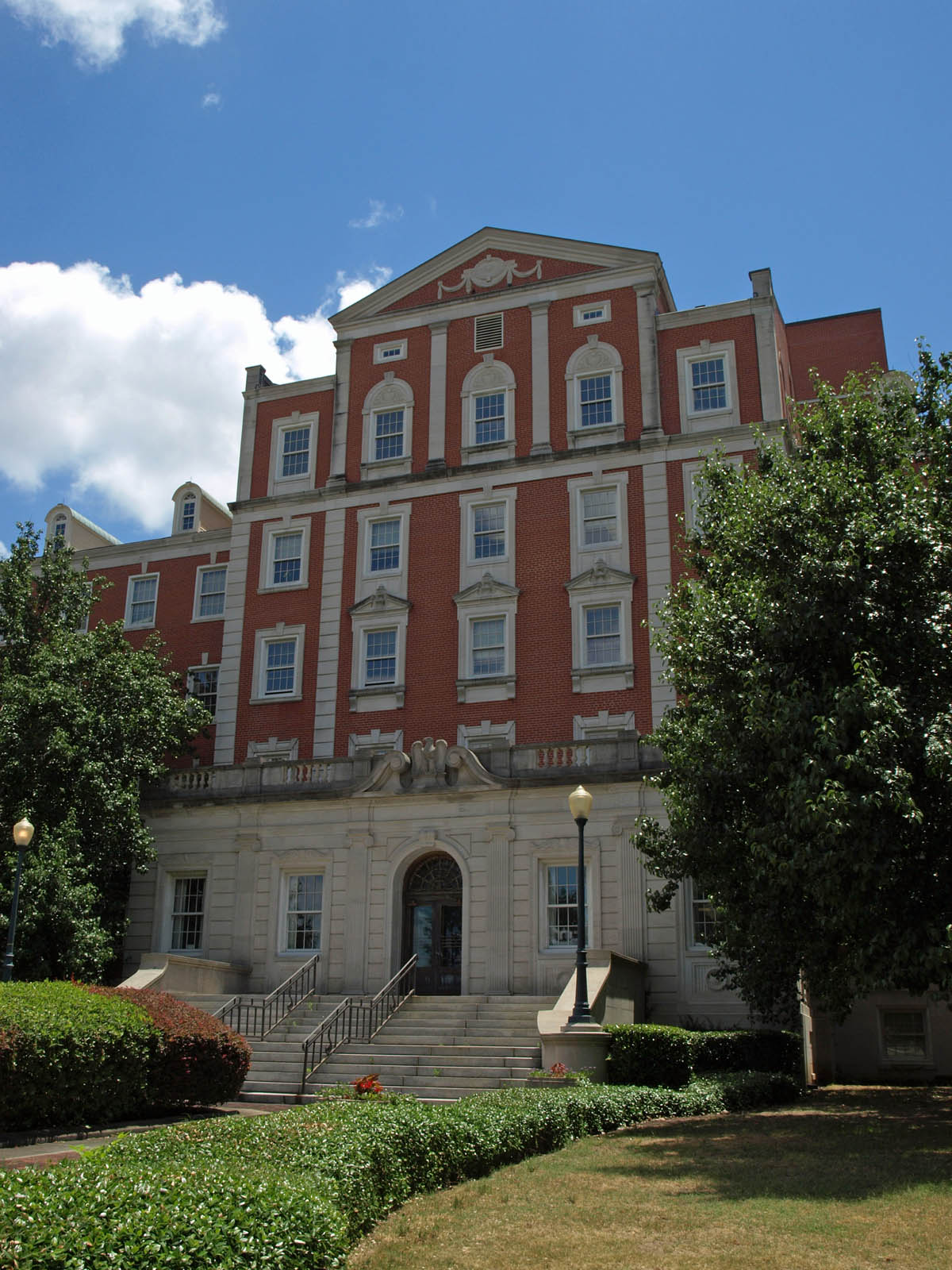
- The hospital in May 2013
- Interactive map of Montgomery Veterans Administration Hospital Historic District
- Location: 215 Perry Hill Rd., Montgomery, Alabama
- Coordinates: 32°22′39″N 86°14′46″W
- Built: 1940
- MPS: United States Second Generation Veterans Hospitals MPS
- NRHP reference No.: 12000141
- Added to NRHP: March 19, 2012

The Central Alabama VA Medical Center–Montgomery is a medical facility of the United States Department of Veterans Affairs (VA) in Montgomery, Alabama. The hospital was built in 1940 and originally consisted of 138 acres (56 ha), but has been reduced to approximately 50 acres (20 ha). The main building is a four-story H-shape building with elements of Colonial Revival and Classical Revival styles. Other historic buildings on the campus include the dining hall, residences for attendants and nurses, and engineering & maintenance buildings.

The hospital was listed on the National Register of Historic Places in 2012.
