= Batavia Veterans Administration Hospital =

- U.S. National Register of Historic Places
- U.S. Historic district
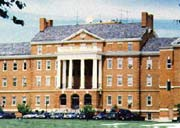
- Batavia Veterans Administration Hospital, September 2009

- Location within New York Location within the United States
- Location: 222 Richmond Ave., Batavia, New York
- Coordinates: 43°00′42″N 78°11′59″W
- Area: 45 acres (18 ha)
- Built: 1932-1950
- Architectural style: Colonial Revival, Classical Revival
- MPS: United States Second Generation Veterans Hospitals Multiple Property Submission
- NRHP reference No.: 12000160
- Added to NRHP: March 27, 2012

Batavia Veterans Administration Hospital is a historic hospital and national historic district located at Batavia in Genesee County, New York. The district includes 15 contributing buildings, 1 contributing site, 1 contributing structure, and 3 contributing objects. They were built or utilized during the period 1932 to 1950. The Veterans Administration opened the facility in 1934, as a regional veteran's hospital. It was later converted to a tuberculosis sanitarium. The original hospital buildings built in 1932 include the main building, kitchen / dining hall / attendant's quarters, recreation building, nurses' quarters, manager's quarters, officer's duplex quarters, laundry, storehouse, boiler house, transformer and animal house, station garage, and the sewage pump house. The administration building was added in 1939. The buildings are constructed of brick and feature decorative elements reflective of the Colonial Revival and Classical Revival styles.

It was added to the National Register of Historic Places in 2012.
