= Northampton Veterans Affairs Medical Center =

- Northampton Veterans Administration Hospital Historic District
- U.S. National Register of Historic Places
- U.S. Historic district
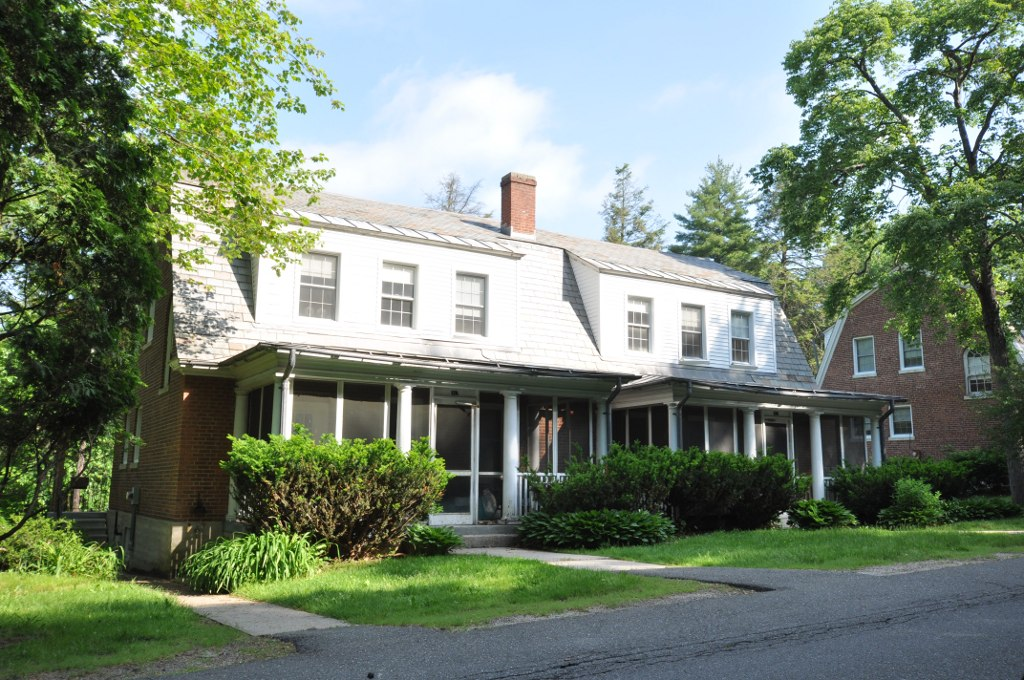
- Housing on the VA Hospital campus

- Location within Massachusetts Location within the United States
- Location: Northampton, Massachusetts
- Coordinates: 42°20′59″N 72°40′54″W
- Area: 105 acres (42 ha)
- Built: 1924
- NRHP reference No.: 12000994
- Added to NRHP: December 4, 2012

The Northampton Veterans Affairs Medical Center, formerly the Northampton Veterans Administration Hospital, is a facility of the United States Department of Veterans Affairs (VA) at 421 Main Street in the Leeds section of northern Northampton, Massachusetts. Its campus once consisted of about 286 acres (116 ha) of land, which had by 2012 been reduced to 105 acres (42 ha). The hospital was opened in 1924 to treat neuropsychiatric patients, but now provides a wider array of medical services.

In 2012 the remaining 105 acre campus was listed as a historic district on the National Register of Historic Places. The district includes the main hospital buildings, as well as residential housing, utility and maintenance buildings, most of which were built no later than 1947, and some of which date to 1922, the earliest period of the facility's construction. It is an excellent example of an intact Period 1 neuropsychiatric VA hospital, and was the first VA hospital in Massachusetts.

== Services offered ==
The Northampton VA provides a wide array of services to veterans living in Western Massachusetts. These include medical and psychiatric care, substance abuse counseling and treatment, treatment for PTSD, and nursing home care for elderly veterans. Active facilities at the center include 85 beds for behavior care, 44 for nursing care, and 16 for substance abuse. The center also coordinates care with VA outpatient facilities across the region.

== See also ==
- National Register of Historic Places listings in Hampshire County, Massachusetts
- List of Veterans Affairs medical facilities
