= JourneyPure =

- Type: Private organization
- Industry: Addiction treatment, Health Care
- Founded: 2014
- Key people: Kevin Lee (Co-founder and CEO), Sam MacMaster (Co-founder and CCO), Stephen Loyd, M.D. (Chief Medical Officer), Brian Wind, M.D. (Chief Clinical Officer)
- Number of employees: 400+
- Website: journeypure.com

JourneyPure is an American health care private organization that treats people experiencing substance use disorders and operates a network of treatment centers throughout the United States. The organization is notable for development of opioid and addiction treatment rehabilitation programs during the ongoing Opioid epidemic in the United States.

The company has corporate offices in Nashville and Murfreesboro and it operates 5 residential rehabs and 14 outpatient clinics in Tennessee, Kentucky and Florida. JourneyPure was founded by Kevin Lee and Sam MacMaster in 2014.

== History ==
JourneyPure was established in January, 2014 in Nashville, Tennessee by Kevin D. Lee and Sam MacMaster. From 2015 to 2019, the company expanded through a number of acquisitions provided by a series of investments from Rolling Hills Ventures and the Post Road Group.

In 2016, the company launched JourneyPure Coaching App, a mobile application to engage and track patients after they complete addiction treatment program. As of March, 2020, JourneyPure operated 19 addiction treatment centers including 3 alcohol and drug rehabs and 6 outpatient clinics in Tennessee, 1 rehab and 5 outpatient clinics in Kentucky and 1 rehab and 3 outpatient clinics in Florida. JourneyPure is a member of National Association of Addiction Treatment Providers (NAATP).

== Rehabilitation methods ==
The addiction recovery methods address the neurobiology of addiction and co-occurring disorders (such as depression, anxiety or bi-polar disorder) after residents receive bio-psycho-social evaluation. Once identified, biological interventions to repair brain neural and neurotransmitter systems damaged by addiction are integrated into the individual's twelve step recovery program. The program also applies Medication-Assisted Treatment (MAT).

The organization's model of rehabilitation is based on both traditional ways of treatment such as cognitive behavioral therapy as well as relatively new methods including mobile application for tracking health progress of the discharged patients and virtual reality.

== CARF accreditation ==
JourneyPure has accreditation from the Commission on Accreditation of Rehabilitation Facilities (CARF) International for the following programs: Detoxification/Withdrawal Management, Intensive Outpatient Treatment (BH), Outpatient Treatment (BH), Partial Hospitalization.

== Controversy ==
In 2016, JourneyPure's facility in Panama City Beach, Florida ran into disgruntled locals who wanted to fence off their neighborhoods from the nearby rehab center. More details about this facility and its services are available on its dedicated page.

In December 2018, The New York Times published a critical article about Medication-Assisted Treatment applied by JourneyPure, which involves such drugs as buprenorphine (also known as Suboxone) or naltrexone (more commonly known as Vivitrol). The use of Medication-Assisted Treatment was acknowledged during the interview by Sam MacMaster, the co-founder of JourneyPure, who himself was skeptical of the efficacy of treatment alone at the expense of traditional abstinence-based recovery programs. He also acknowledged the pressure from the health insurance companies to use Medication-Assisted Treatments programs.

== See also ==
- Opioid epidemic in the United States
- Commission on Accreditation of Rehabilitation Facilities (CARF)
