= VA Pacific Islands Health Care System =

US Veterans Affairs healthcare group located in the Pacific Islands

- United States Department of Veterans Affairs
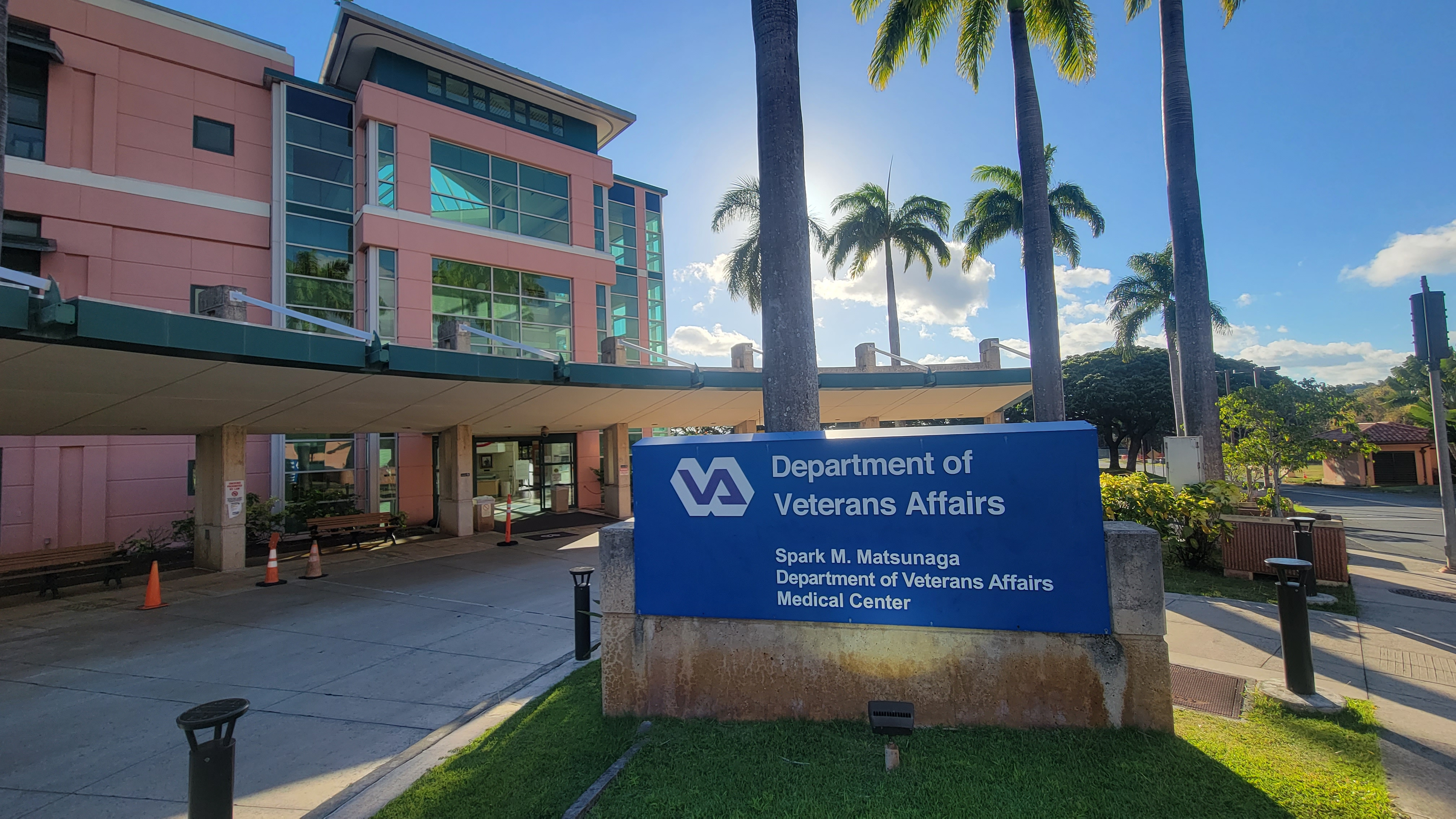

Geography
- Location: 459 Patterson Road, Honolulu, Hawaii, U.S.
- Coordinates: 21.361470174244033°N 157.88938193618006°W

Organisation
- Care system: Triwest
- Type: VA medical facility

Services
- Emergency department: No

Links
- Website: www.va.gov/pacific-islands-health-care/
- Lists: Hospitals in U.S.

The VA Pacific Islands Health Care System, also called the VAPIHCS, is a United States Department of Veterans Affairs health care organization consisting of 12 sites of care across the Pacific Islands.

== Geography ==
The geographic catchment area of VAPIHCS across the Pacific.

The geographic coverage area of this VA Medical Center extends across much of the Pacific. The catchment area extends from the Hawaiian Islands, to Guam, Saipan, and the Commonwealth of the Northern Mariana Islands (CNMI), and to American Samoa. VA will be extending care into the COFA states. This expansion increases the geographic coverage to approximately 8.5 million sq miles, or more than twice the area of the continental United States.

== Operations ==
VAPIHCS is currently one of three VA Medical Centers without an inpatient hospital. It does however have a combination of inpatient, outpatient, residential, and nursing home treatment services through either VA owned facilities, or through partnerships with other community health care organizations.

The Spark. M Matsunaga VA Medical Center is located on the grounds of the Tripler Army Medical Center military facility in Honolulu, Hawaii and comprises three VA facilities, the Ambulatory Care Clinic (ACC), the Center For Aging (CFA) building which currently houses both the Community Living Center (CLC) and the PTSD Residential Recovery Program (PRRP), and the administrative E-Wing building. The other sites of care under the VAPIHCS umbrella are the Community Based Outpatient Clinics (CBOC) across the Hawaiian Islands, Guam, and American Samoa.

On April 8th, 2024, the Daniel Kahikina Akaka Community Based Outpatient Clinic opened in Kapolei, Oahu. This new $130 million facility is an 88,000 sq foot VA-owned clinic on the west side of Oahu and provides multispecialty outpatient care. It was named after the late United States Senator Daniel Akaka, an Army Veteran and champion for Veteran healthcare.

=== Sites of Care ===
VAPIHCS Headquarters: Honolulu, Hawaii

Facility	City	State	Type
Spark M. Matsunaga Veterans Affairs Medical Center	Honolulu	HI	VAMC
Daniel K. Akaka Multispecialty Community Based Outpatient Clinic	Kapolei	HI	CBOC
Windward Community Based Outpatient Clinic	Kaneohe	HI	CBOC
Kona Community Based Outpatient Clinic	Kona	HI	CBOC
Hilo Community Based Outpatient Clinic	Hilo	HI	CBOC
Maui Community Based Outpatient Clinic	Kahului	HI	CBOC
Kauai Community Based Outpatient Clinic	Kauaʻi County	HI	CBOC
Guam Community Based Outpatient Clinic	Agana Heights	GU	CBOC
American Samoa Community Based Outpatient Clinic	Pago Pago	AS	CBOC

Data sourced from va.gov

=== Services ===
- Primary Care
- Women's Health
- Specialty Care

- Cardiology
- Gastroenterology
- Neurology
- Endocrinology
- Podiatry
- Optometry
- Infectious Diseases

- Mental Health Services

- Outpatient Mental Health
- PTSD Residential Recovery Program (PRRP)

- Geriatrics and Extended Care

- GeriPACT Outpatient Clinics
- Home Based Primary Care (HBPC)
- Hospital in Home (HiH)
- Community Living Center nursing home

- Physical Medicine & Rehabilitation

- Physical and Occupational Therapy
- Audiology
- Spinal Cord Injury and Disorders (SCI/D)
- Traumatic Brain Injury (TBI)
- Acupuncture

- Dentistry
- Diagnostic Radiology
- Pharmacy
- Laboratory
- Whole Health

Data sourced from va.gov

== Education ==
VAPIHCS has over 100 academic affiliations including:

- John A. Burns School of Medicine
- Tripler Army Medical Center
- University Of Guam’s School of Nursing & Health Sciences
- Daniel K. Inouye College of Pharmacy at the University of Hawai’i at Hilo

== Research Non-Profit ==
The Pacific Health Research and Education Institute (PHREI) is a non-profit organization affiliated with the VAPIHCS in order to promote the advancement of health care in the Pacific Region with emphasis on Veteran health issues.

== Accreditation ==
- Joint Commission.
- The Commission on Accreditation of Rehabilitation Facilities
- Ascellon Corporation

== See also ==
- List of Veterans Affairs medical facilities
- List of Veterans Affairs medical facilities by state
