= Daniel K. Akaka VA Clinic =

United States Department of Veterans Affairs outpatient clinic located in Hawaii

- United States Department of Veterans Affairs

Geography
- Location: 91-1051 Franklin D Roosevelt Ave, Kapolei, Hawaii, Honolulu, Hawaii, U.S.
- Coordinates: 21.32448398654589°N 158.0860096362484°W

Organisation
- Care system: Triwest
- Type: VA Outpatient Clinic

Services
- Emergency department: No

History
- Opened: April 8, 2024

Links
- Website: www.va.gov/pacific-islands-health-care/locations/daniel-kahikina-akaka-va-clinic/
- Lists: Hospitals in U.S.

The Daniel Kahikina Akaka VA Clinic (Akaka VA Clinic) is a United States Department of Veterans Affairs multispecialty Community Based Outpatient Clinic (CBOC) in Kapolei, Oahu that provides care for Veterans across the Pacific Islands.

== History ==
The Akaka Clinic started as the Advanced Leeward Outpatient Healthcare Access (ALOHA) project, taking over a decade to get to the groundbreaking stage on December 22, 2021. President Biden signed the bill naming the VA clinic after the late United States Senator Daniel Akaka on June 7th, 2022. Senator Akaka was an Army Veteran, the first Native Hawaiian elected to Congress who served for more than three decades, and champion for Veteran healthcare.

On April 8th, 2024, the Akaka VA Clinic formally opened to patients. The 88,000 sq ft facility cost $130 million to build and increases direct access to healthcare for Veterans on the west side of Oahu, and indirect access to Veterans across the entire Pacific.

== Operations ==
The geographic catchment area of VAPIHCS across the Pacific.

The VA Pacific Islands Health Care System (VAPIHCS) is the facility that provides care for Veterans across the Pacific Islands. VAPIHCS comprises the Spark M. Matsunaga VA Medical Center located in Honolulu, and eight CBOCs across the Hawaiian Islands, Guam, and American Samoa. The Akaka Clinic is the largest CBOC, and provides the widest scope of medical services, of the eight CBOCs. VA is planning to extend care, when so authorized by the United States Secretary of Veterans Affairs, into the COFA states. This expansion increases the geographic coverage of VAPIHCS and its CBOCs from approximately 5 million sq miles to approximately 8.5 million sq miles, or more than twice the area of the continental United States.

=== Services ===
- Primary Care
- Women's Health
- Specialty Care
- Mental Health Services
- Geriatrics
- Physical Medicine & Rehabilitation
- Dentistry
- Diagnostic Radiology
- Pharmacy
- Laboratory
- Whole Health

== Accreditation ==
- Joint Commission.
- The Commission on Accreditation of Rehabilitation Facilities

== See also ==
- List of Veterans Affairs medical facilities
- List of Veterans Affairs medical facilities by state
