= East Orange VA Medical Center =

Hospital in East Orange, New Jersey

- United States Department of Veterans Affairs

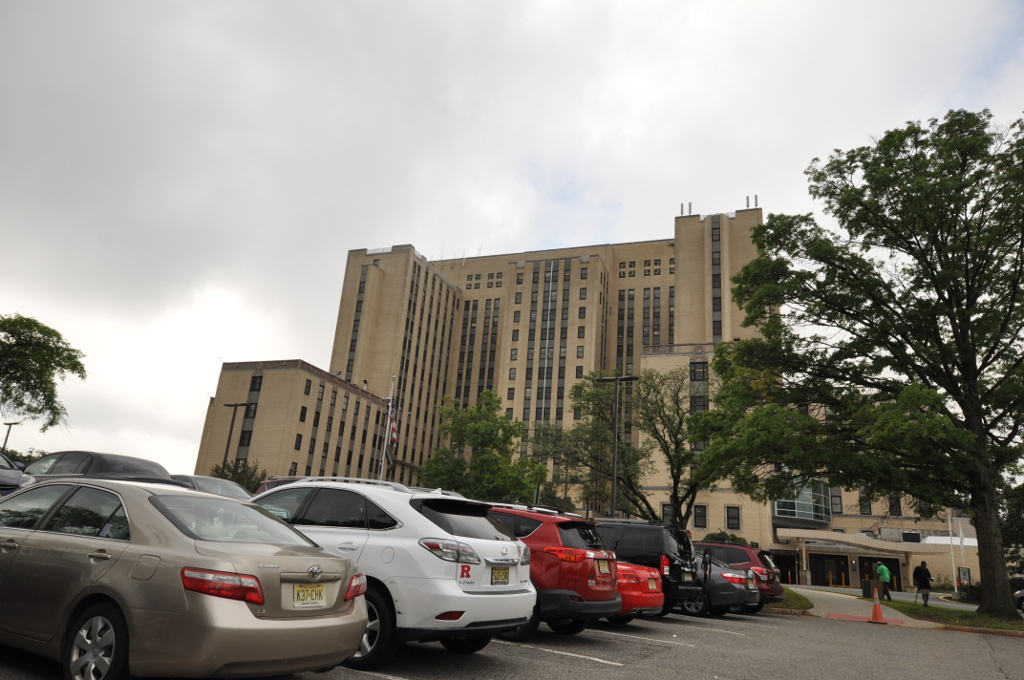

Geography
- Location: 385 Tremont Avenue; East Orange, New Jersey
- Coordinates: 40°45′09″N 74°14′11″W

Links
- East Orange VA Hospital
- U.S. National Register of Historic Places
- U.S. Historic district
- New Jersey Register of Historic Places
- Location within Essex County, New Jersey Location within New Jersey Location within the United States
- Area: 34 acres (14 ha)
- Architectural style: Art Deco
- MPS: United States Third Generation Veterans Hospitals, 1946–1958
- NRHP reference No.: 100002831
- NJRHP No.: 5674

Significant dates
- Added to NRHP: September 4, 2018
- Designated NJRHP: August 9, 2018

The East Orange VA Medical Center is a United States Department of Veterans Affairs hospital complex located at 385 Tremont Avenue in East Orange of Essex County, New Jersey. Established in 1952, it is part of the VA New Jersey Health Care System. Listed as the East Orange VA Hospital, it was added to the National Register of Historic Places on September 4, 2018, for its significance in health/medicine.

== History ==
After World War II, the Veterans Administration built new medical facilities near urban areas. In 1946, the VA selected this site, part of the estate of Louis Bamberger, who had built his wealth as owner of Bamberger's department store in Newark. Construction started in 1949, and the hospital opened in 1952.

== Historic district ==
The East Orange VA Hospital is a 34-acre (14 ha) historic district encompassing the medical center campus. It was listed as part of the United States Third Generation Veterans Hospitals, 1946–1958, Multiple Property Submission (MPS). The district includes 9 contributing buildings. The buildings are clad in brick and feature elements of Art Deco.

== See also ==
- National Register of Historic Places listings in Essex County, New Jersey
- List of Veterans Affairs medical facilities by state
- Lyons VA Medical Center – first VA hospital in New Jersey
