= Lyons VA Medical Center =

Hospital in Lyons, New Jersey

- United States Department of Veterans Affairs

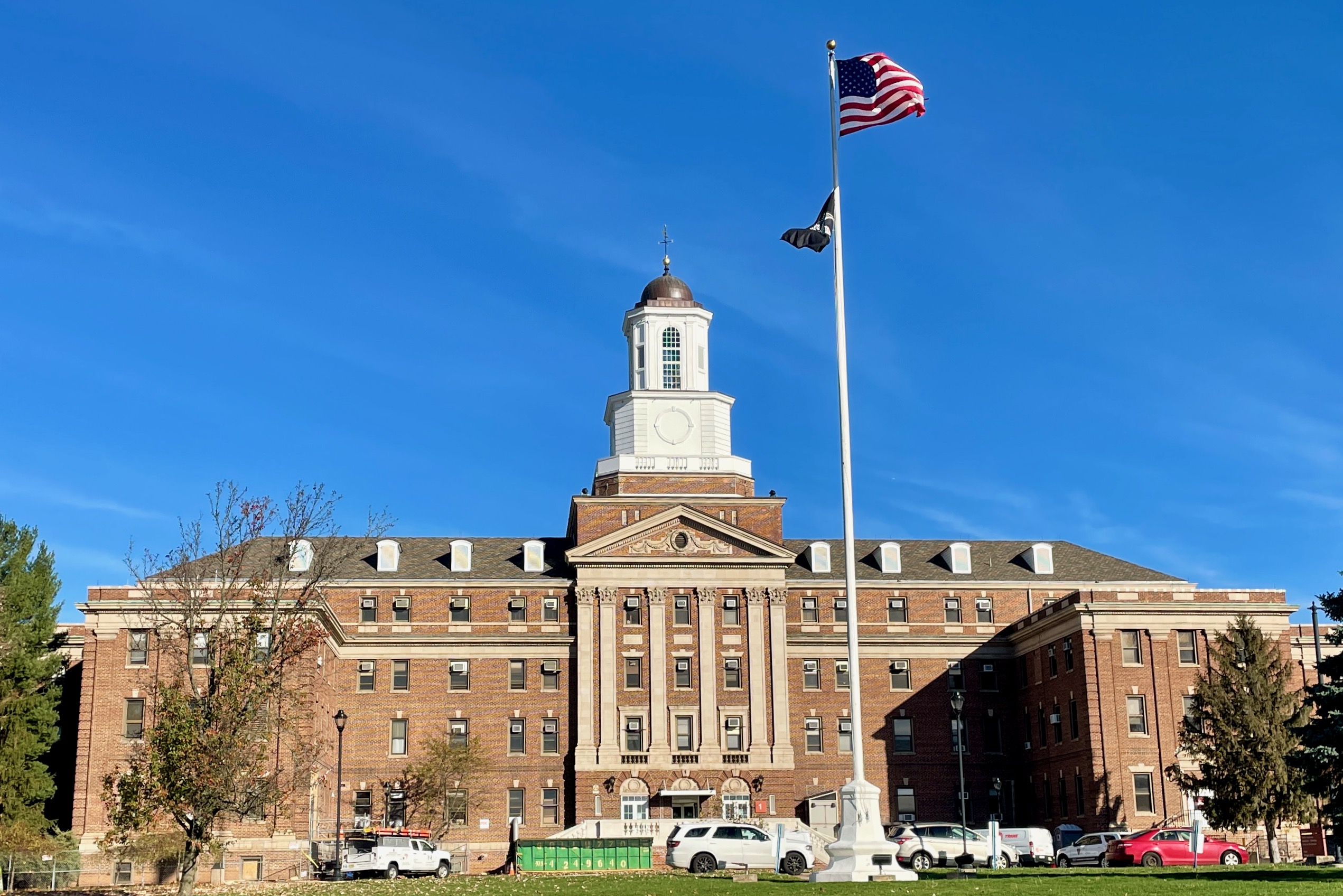
- Main Building and flagpole

Geography
- Location: 151 Knollcroft Road; Lyons, New Jersey
- Coordinates: 40°40′07″N 74°33′27″W

Links
- Lyons Veterans Administration Hospital Historic District
- U.S. National Register of Historic Places
- U.S. Historic district
- New Jersey Register of Historic Places
- Location within Somerset County, New Jersey Location within New Jersey Location within the United States
- Area: 303 acres (123 ha)
- Architectural style: Colonial Revival, Classical Revival
- MPS: United States Second Generation Veterans Hospitals MPS
- NRHP reference No.: 13000461
- NJRHP No.: 2476

Significant dates
- Added to NRHP: July 3, 2013
- Designated NJRHP: April 29, 2013

The Lyons VA Medical Center is a United States Department of Veterans Affairs hospital complex located at 151 Knollcroft Road in the Lyons section of Bernards Township in Somerset County, New Jersey. Established in 1930, it is part of the VA New Jersey Health Care System. Listed as the Lyons Veterans Administration Hospital Historic District, it was added to the National Register of Historic Places on July 3, 2013, for its significance in architecture, health/medicine, and politics/government.

== History ==
Funding for the medical center was first provided by the World War Veterans Act of 1924. The 272-acre (110 ha) estate of Walter E. Reynolds, known as Knollcroft, was purchased in November 1928. Construction began in June 1929. The first patients were admitted in November 1930. The facility was dedicated on July 25, 1931.

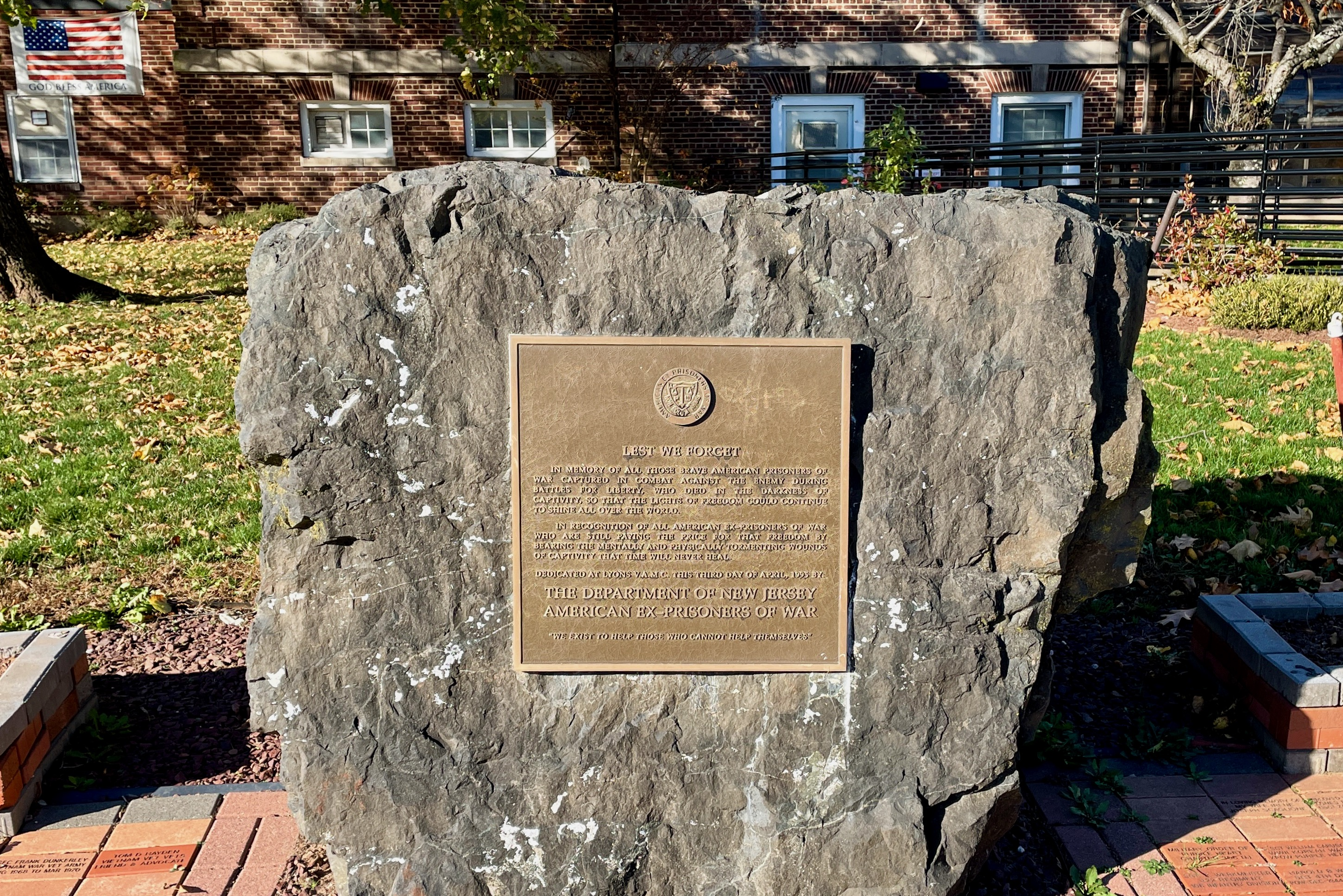
Lest We Forget plague, 1995

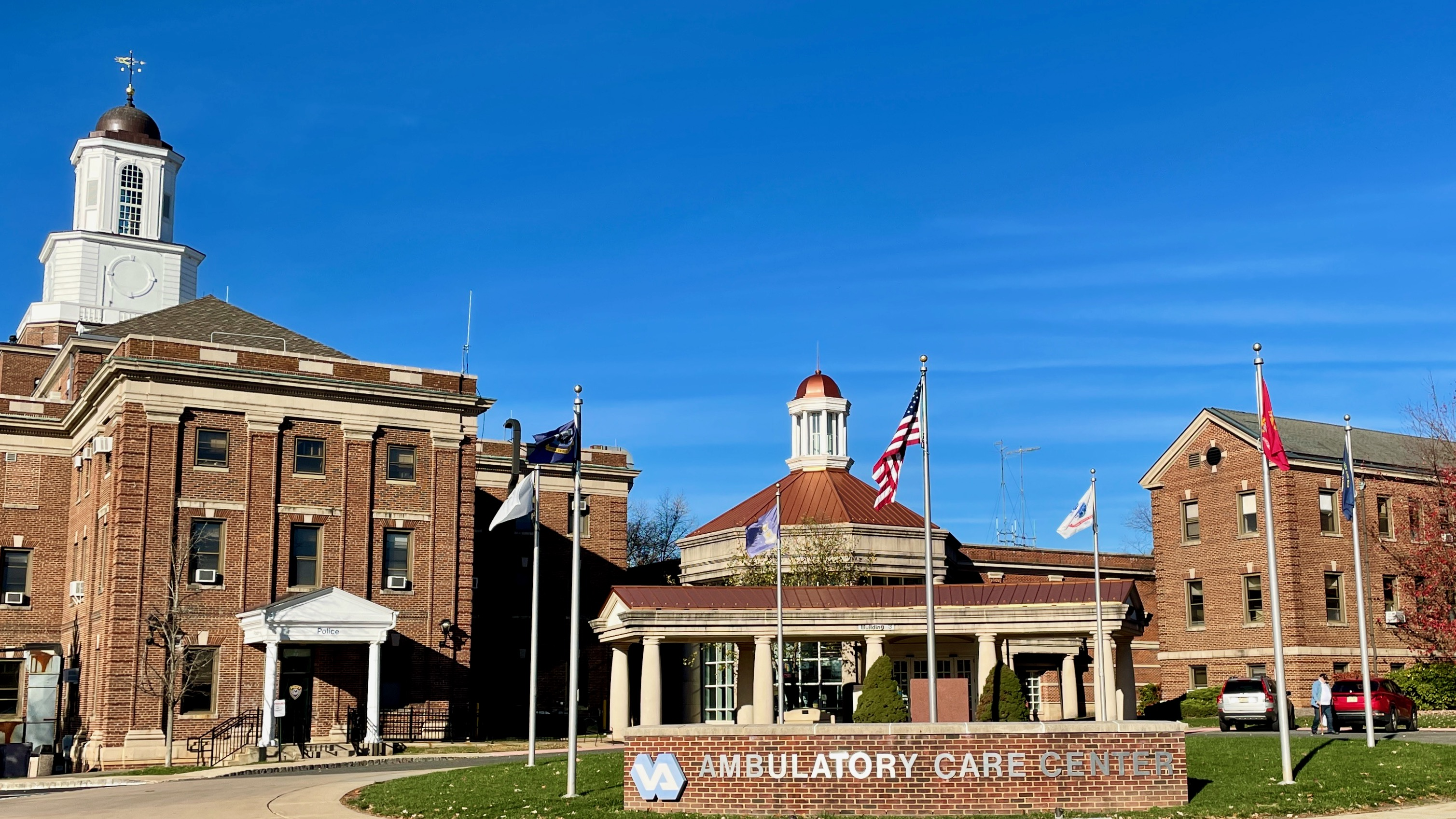
Ambulatory Care Center, 2005

== Historic district ==
The Lyons Veterans Administration Hospital Historic District is a 303-acre (123 ha) historic district encompassing the medical center campus. It was listed as part of the United States Second Generation Veterans Hospitals Multiple Property Submission (MPS). The district includes 31 contributing buildings and 3 other contributing properties. The Main Building was completed in 1930 and features Classical Revival architecture, with six Corinthian pilasters, decorated pediment, and domed cupola. The flagpole in front of the building is a contributing object.

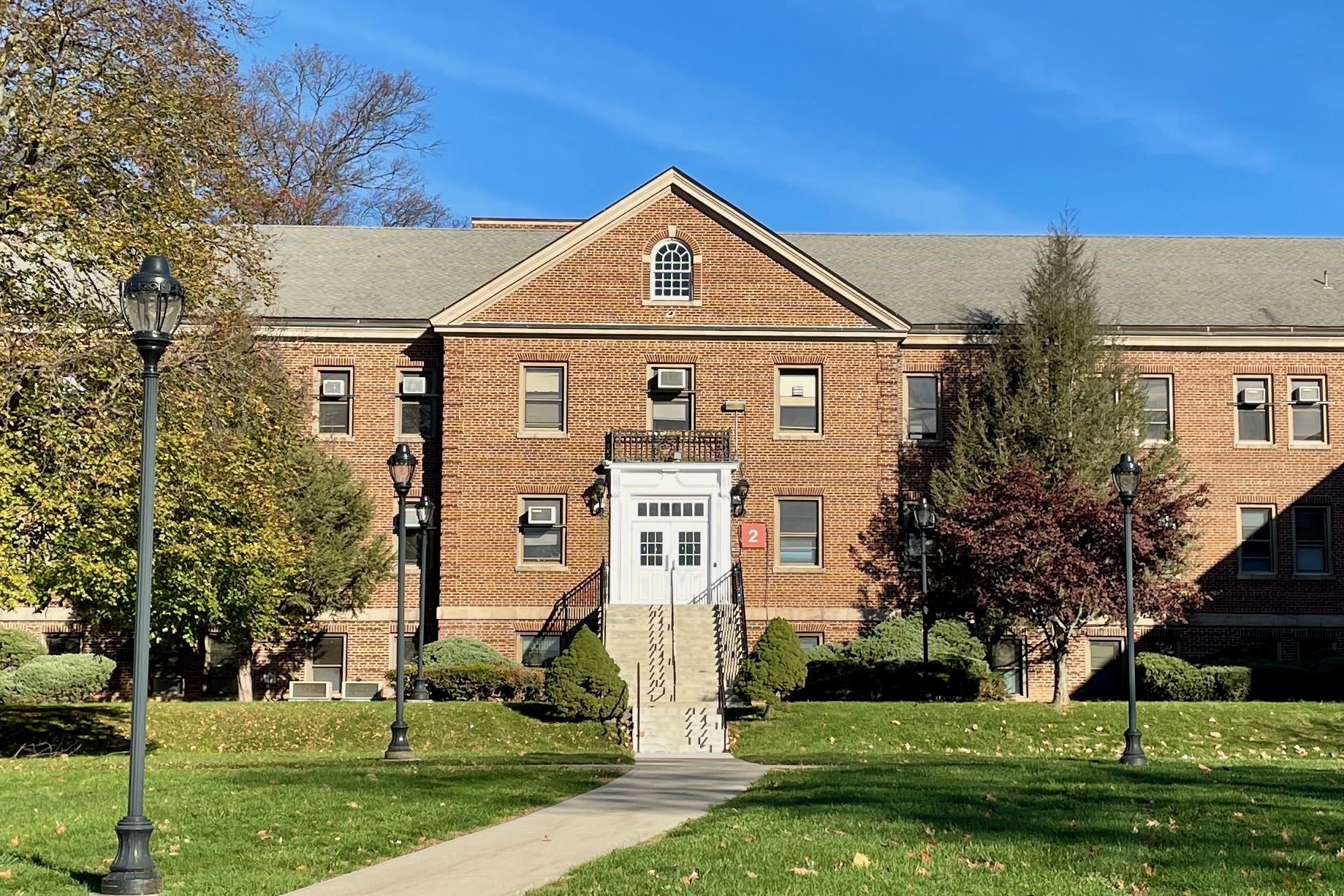
Acute Building, 1929

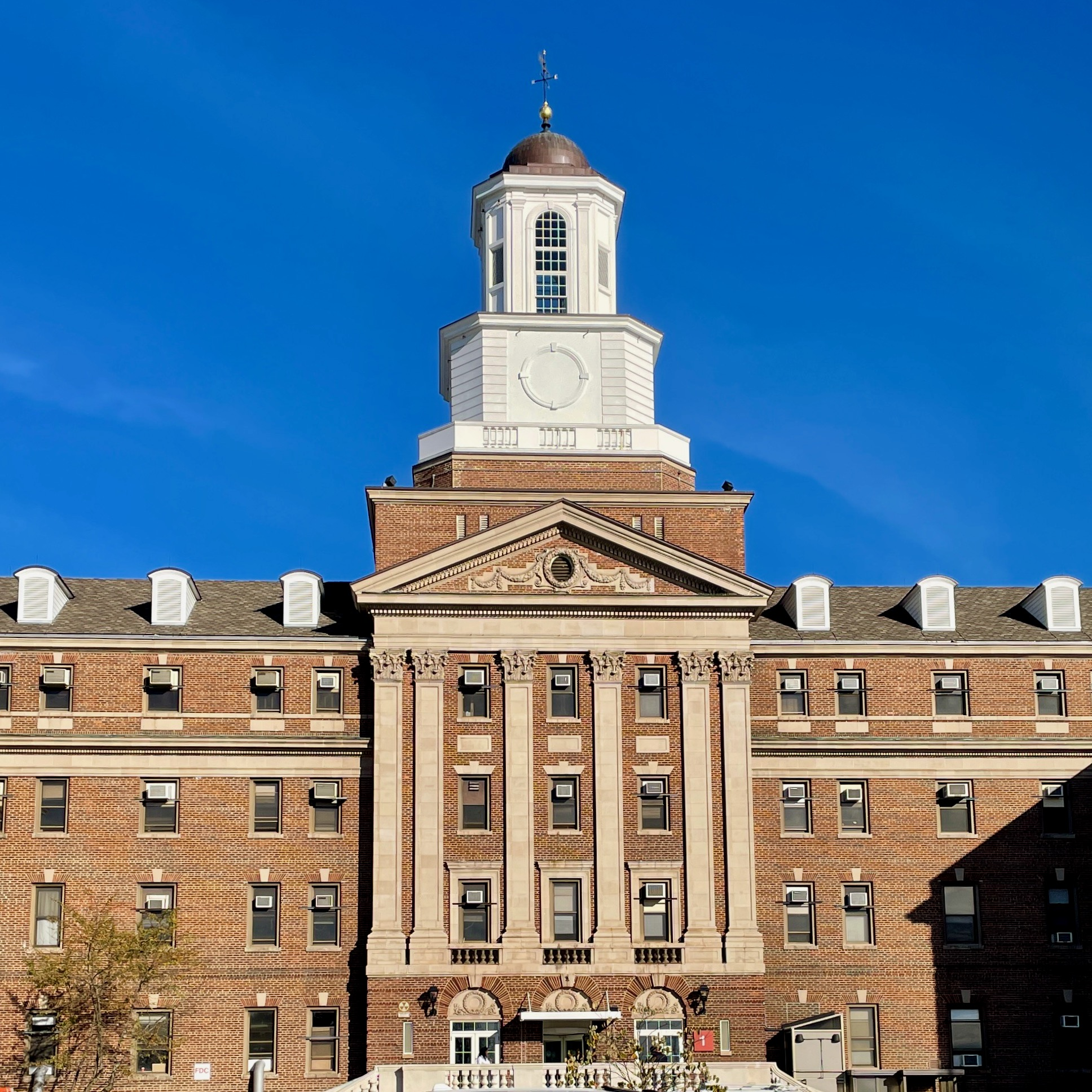
Main Building, 1930

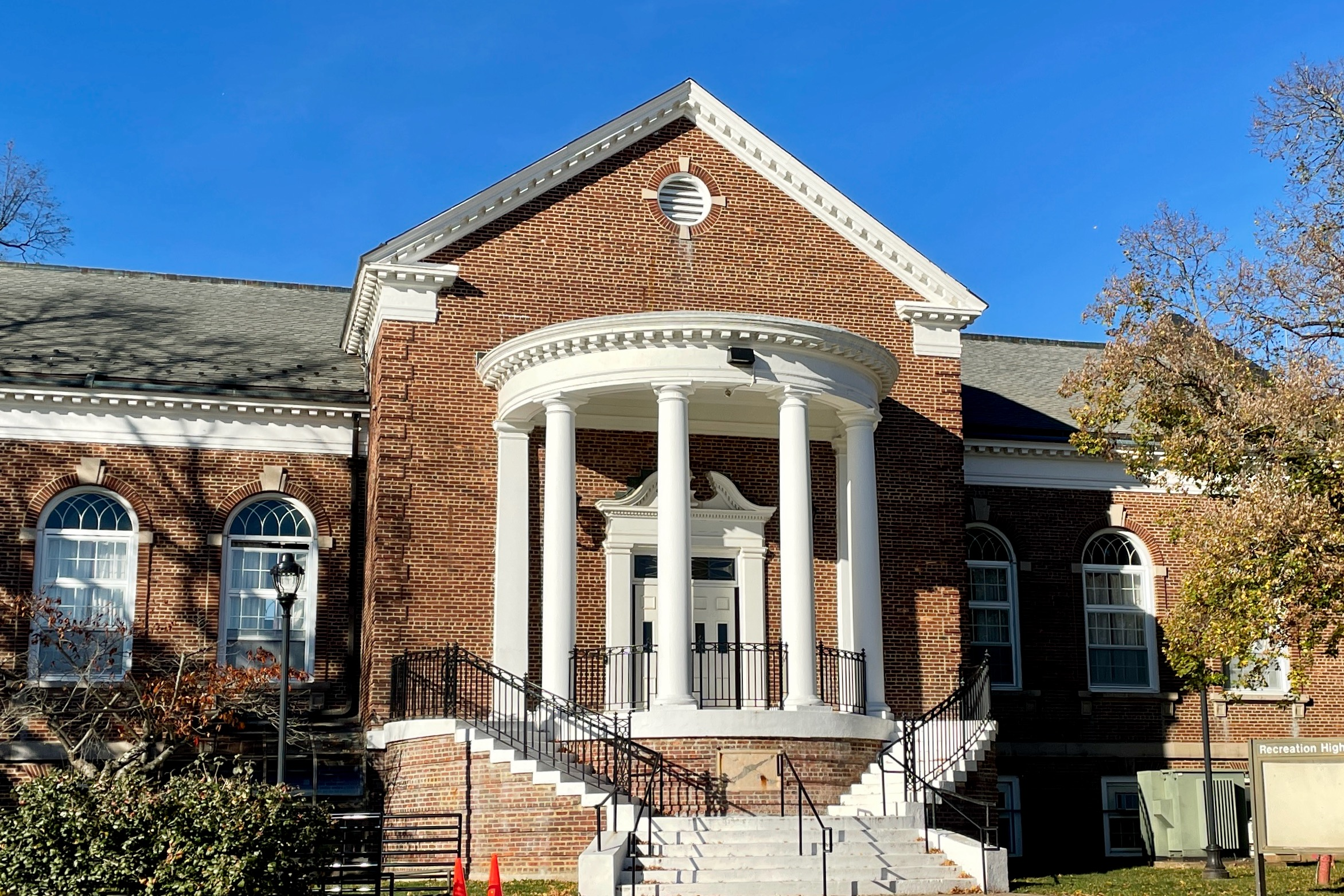
Recreation Building, 1930

== See also ==
- National Register of Historic Places listings in Somerset County, New Jersey
- List of Veterans Affairs medical facilities by state
- East Orange VA Medical Center – second VA hospital in New Jersey
