= Lyons, New Jersey =

Populated place in Somersey County, New Jersey, US

- Census-designated place
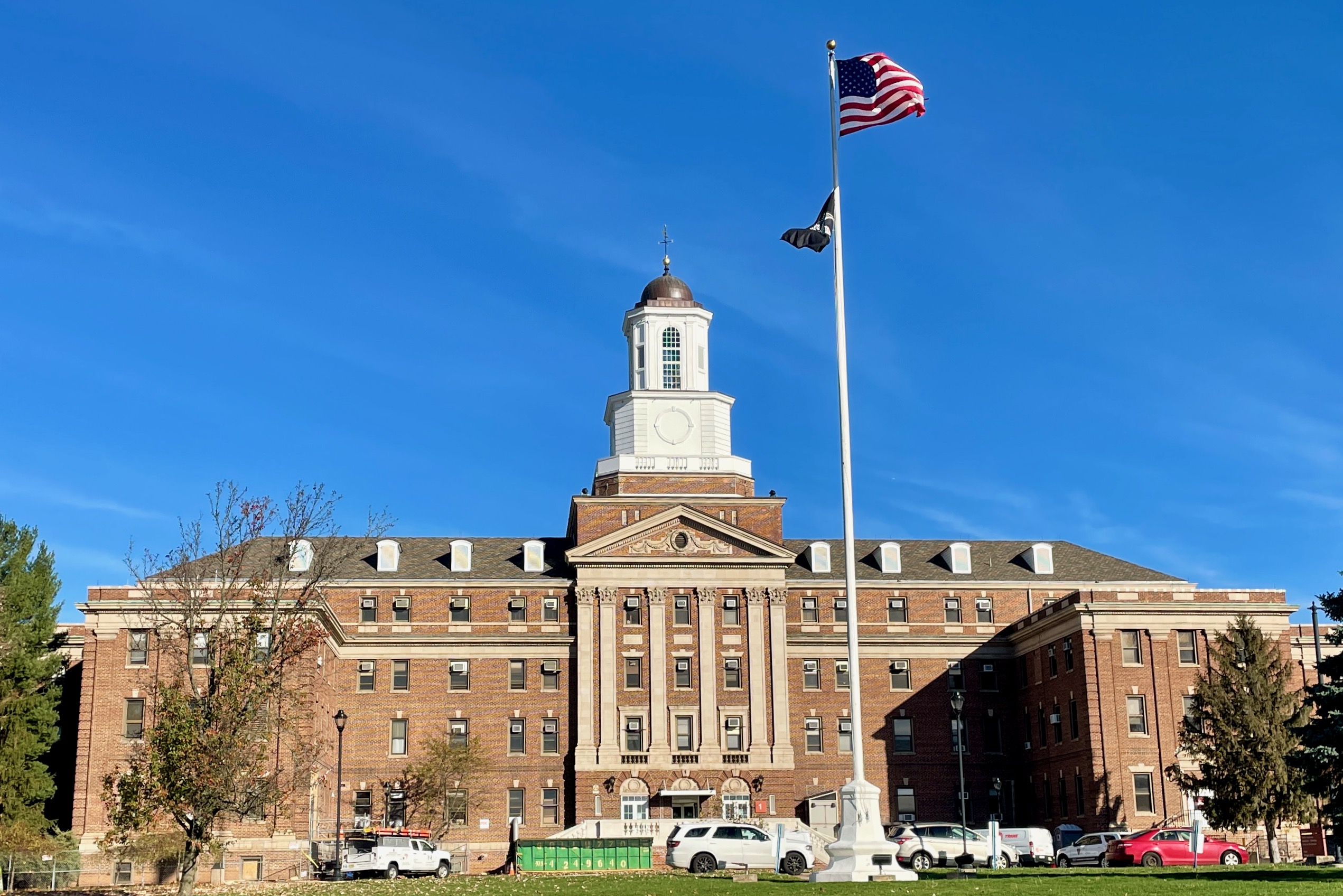
- Lyons VA Medical Center

- Location in Somerset County Location in New Jersey Location in the United States
- Coordinates: 40°41′07″N 74°32′50″W
- Country: United States
- State: New Jersey
- County: Somerset
- Township: Bernards

Area
  - Total: 3.87 sq mi (10.03 km^{2})
  - Land: 3.85 sq mi (9.97 km^{2})
  - Water: 0.023 sq mi (0.06 km^{2})
- Elevation: 299 ft (91 m)

Population (2020)
  - Total: 5,345
  - Density: 1,387.9/sq mi (535.89/km^{2})
- Time zone: UTC−05:00 (Eastern (EST))
  - Summer (DST): UTC−04:00 (EDT)
- ZIP Code: 07939
- Area code: 908
- FIPS code: 34-42180
- GNIS feature ID: 878001

Lyons is an unincorporated community and census-designated place (CDP) located within Bernards Township, in Somerset County, in the U.S. state of New Jersey. As of the 2020 census, Lyons had a population of 5,345. Lyons is 2.5 miles (4.0 km) south-southeast of Bernardsville. Lyons has a post office with ZIP Code 07939.

== Demographics ==
Historical population
| Census | Pop. | Note | %± |
|---|---|---|---|
| 2020 | 5,345 | | — |
U.S. Decennial Census; 2020

Lyons was first listed as a census designated place in the 2020 U.S. census.

=== 2020 census ===
As of the 2020 census, Lyons had a population of 5,345. The median age was 49.2 years. 23.2% of residents were under the age of 18 and 20.2% were 65 years of age or older. For every 100 females there were 109.0 males, and for every 100 females age 18 and over there were 107.0 males age 18 and over.

100.0% of residents lived in urban areas, while 0.0% lived in rural areas.

There were 1,693 households in Lyons, of which 42.8% had children under the age of 18 living in them. Of all households, 71.4% were married-couple households, 11.8% were households with a male householder and no spouse or partner present, and 14.9% were households with a female householder and no spouse or partner present. About 18.9% of all households were made up of individuals and 9.7% had someone living alone who was 65 years of age or older.

There were 1,770 housing units, of which 4.4% were vacant. The homeowner vacancy rate was 0.6% and the rental vacancy rate was 7.0%.

Lyons CDP, New Jersey – Racial and ethnic composition Note: the US Census treats Hispanic/Latino as an ethnic category. This table excludes Latinos from the racial categories and assigns them to a separate category. Hispanics/Latinos may be of any race.
| Race / Ethnicity (NH = Non-Hispanic) | Pop 2020 | 2020 |
|---|---|---|
| White alone (NH) | 3,802 | 71.13% |
| Black or African American alone (NH) | 205 | 3.84% |
| Native American or Alaska Native alone (NH) | 1 | 0.02% |
| Asian alone (NH) | 821 | 15.36% |
| Native Hawaiian or Pacific Islander alone (NH) | 5 | 0.09% |
| Other race alone (NH) | 16 | 0.30% |
| Mixed race or Multiracial (NH) | 176 | 3.29% |
| Hispanic or Latino (any race) | 319 | 5.97% |
| Total | 5,345 | 100.00% |

== Economy ==
The Lyons VA Medical Center is a U. S. Department of Veterans Affairs hospital located here. 38 buildings, containing neuropsychiatric patients resided here in 1931. In 2018, it employed 60 physicians.

== Population ==
2010 Census Data
| Category | Number |
|---|---|
| Total population | 228 |
| Male population | 216 |
| Female population | 12 |
| Median age (years) | 54 |
| White Population | 103 |
| Black Population | 117 |
| Indian Population | 1 |
| Asian Population | 0 |
| Hawaiian Population | 0 |
| Hispanic Population | 15 |
| Median age (Male) | 54.2 |
| Median age (Female) | 46.5 |
| Average household size | 2 |

== Transportation ==
The community is served by New Jersey Transit train service at the Lyons station on the Gladstone Branch to Newark Broad Street Station and Hoboken Terminal.

== History ==
- The area called Lyons is remembered for the David Lyon farm which was a large part of the area.
- Lyons Depot - This one-story Tudor Revival and Mission Revival style structure was built in 1931. It is faced with stucco and brick and has limestone trim with carved rosette ornamentation at the gable ends. It was designed by Delaware Lackawanna and Western Railroad (DL&W) architect D.T. Mack or one of his staff. It was built largely to accommodate the growing number of visitors to Veterans Hospital. It was the last station built on the Gladstone Branch. Is now owned by Bernards Township.
- Lyons Train Station state and national historic registry - NR 6-22-84 SR 3-17-84
- Groundbreaking started on the Lyons VA Hospital on July 11, 1929.
- The first patients arrived at the Lyons facility on November 12, 1930, having been transferred from the Bronx VA Hospital in New York City. By July 1931 a total of 415 patients were living and receiving therapy at the hospital.
- Hospital dedicated Saturday, July 23, 1931.
- The Lyons VA Medical Center was the only VA hospital in the state until one in East Orange opened in 1952. It was listed on the NRHP as the Lyons Veterans Administration Hospital Historic District in 2013.
- There is a Lyons Fire Department and it's on the grounds of the Lyons VA.
- Local historian Brooks Betz noted that the population growth of Bernards Township exploded over the next two decades due to people moving to the area to support the Lyons VA.
