= List of Veterans Affairs medical facilities by state =

== A ==
=== Alabama ===
Service	City	Facility
VA Medical Center	Birmingham	Birmingham VA Medical Center
VA Medical Center	Montgomery	Central Alabama VA Medical Center-Montgomery
VA Medical Center	Tuscaloosa	Tuscaloosa VA Medical Center
VA Medical Center	Tuskegee	Central Alabama VA Medical Center-Tuskegee
Outpatient Clinic	Huntsville	Huntsville Outpatient Clinic
Outpatient Clinic	Montgomery	Central Alabama Montgomery VA Clinic
Community Based Outpatient Clinic	Bessemer	Bessemer VA Clinic
Community Based Outpatient Clinic	Birmingham	Birmingham VA Clinic
Community Based Outpatient Clinic	Birmingham	Birmingham East VA Clinic
Community Based Outpatient Clinic	Childerburg	Childersburg VA Clinic
Community Based Outpatient Clinic	Dothan	Dothan 1 VA Clinic
Community Based Outpatient Clinic	Fort Novosel	Wiregrass VA Clinic
Community Based Outpatient Clinic	Gadsen	Rainbow City VA Clinic
Community Based Outpatient Clinic	Guntersville	Guntersville VA Clinic
Community Based Outpatient Clinic	Jasper	Jasper VA Clinic
Community Based Outpatient Clinic	Madison	Decatur-Madison VA Clinic
Community Based Outpatient Clinic	Mobile	Mobile VA Clinic
Community Based Outpatient Clinic	Monroeville	Monroe County VA Clinic
Community Based Outpatient Clinic	Oxford	Oxford VA Clinic
Community Based Outpatient Clinic	Selma	Selma VA Clinic
Community Based Outpatient Clinic	Sheffield	Florence VA Clinic

=== Alaska ===
Service	City	Facility
VA Medical Center	Anchorage	Colonel Mary Louise Rasmuson Campus of the Alaska VA Healthcare System
Community Based Outpatient Clinic	Joint Base Elmendorf–Richardson	Elmendorf-Richardson VA Clinic
Community Based Outpatient Clinic	Fairbanks	Fairbanks VA Clinic
Community Based Outpatient Clinic	Homer	Homer VA Clinic
Community Based Outpatient Clinic	Juneau	Juneau VA Clinic
Community Based Outpatient Clinic	Wasilla	Mat-Su VA Clinic
Community Based Outpatient Clinic	Soldotna	Soldotna VA Clinic

=== American Samoa ===
Service	City	Facility
Community Based Outpatient Clinic	Pago Pago	Faleomavaega Eni Fa'aua'a Hunkin VA Clinic

=== Arizona ===
Service	City	Facility
VA Medical Center	Phoenix	Carl T. Hayden Veterans' Administration Medical Center
VA Medical Center	Prescott	Bob Stump Department of Veterans Affairs Medical Center
VA Medical Center	Tucson	Tucson VA Medical Center
Outpatient Clinic	Gilbert	Southeast Veterans Affairs Health Care Clinic – Gilbert, Arizona
Community Based Outpatient Clinic	Anthem	Anthem VA Clinic
Community Based Outpatient Clinic	Casa Grande	Casa Grande VA Clinic
Community Based Outpatient Clinic	Chinle	Chinle VA Clinic
Community Based Outpatient Clinic	Cottonwood	Cottonwood VA Clinic
Community Based Outpatient Clinic	Flagstaff	Flagstaff VA Clinic
Community Based Outpatient Clinic	Globe	Globe VA Clinic
Community Based Outpatient Clinic	Holbrook	Holbrook VA Clinic
Community Based Outpatient Clinic	Green Valley	Green Valley VA Clinic
Community Based Outpatient Clinic	Kayenta	Kayenta VA Clinic
Community Based Outpatient Clinic	Kingman	Kingman VA Clinic
Community Based Outpatient Clinic	Lake Havasu City	Lake Havasu City VA Clinic
Community Based Outpatient Clinic	Page	Page VA Clinic
Community Based Outpatient Clinic	Payson	Payson VA Clinic
Community Based Outpatient Clinic	Phoenix	Phoenix Midtown VA Clinic
Community Based Outpatient Clinic	Phoenix	Southwest VA Clinic
Community Based Outpatient Clinic	Phoenix	Thunderbird VA Clinic
Community Based Outpatient Clinic	Polacca	Polacca VA Clinic
Community Based Outpatient Clinic	Safford	Safford VA Clinic
Community Based Outpatient Clinic	Show Low	Show Low VA Clinic
Community Based Outpatient Clinic	Sierra Vista	Sierra Vista VA Clinic
Community Based Outpatient Clinic	Surprise	Northwest VA Clinic
Community Based Outpatient Clinic	Tuba City	Tuba City VA Clinic
Community Based Outpatient Clinic	Tucson	Northwest Tucson VA Clinic
Community Based Outpatient Clinic	Tucson	Southeast Tucson VA Clinic
Community Based Outpatient Clinic	Yuma	Yuma VA Clinic

=== Arkansas ===
Service	City	Facility
VA Medical Center	Fayetteville	Veterans Health Care System of the Ozarks
VA Medical Center	Little Rock	Central Arkansas Veterans Healthcare System – John L. McClellan Memorial Veterans Hospital
VA Medical Center	North Little Rock	Central Arkansas Veterans Healthcare System – Eugene J. Towbin Healthcare Center
Community Based Outpatient Clinic	Conway	Conway VA Clinic
Community Based Outpatient Clinic	El Dorado	El Dorado VA Clinic
Community Based Outpatient Clinic	Ft Smith	Fort Smith VA Clinic
Community Based Outpatient Clinic	Harrison	Harrison VA Clinic
Community Based Outpatient Clinic	Helena	Helena VA Clinic
Community Based Outpatient Clinic	Hot Springs	Hot Springs VA Clinic
Community Based Outpatient Clinic	Jonesboro	Jonesboro VA Clinic
Community Based Outpatient Clinic	Mena	Mena VA Clinic
Community Based Outpatient Clinic	Mountain Home	Mountain Home VA Clinic
Community Based Outpatient Clinic	Ozack	Ozark VA Clinic
Community Based Outpatient Clinic	Paragould	Paragould VA Clinic
Community Based Outpatient Clinic	Pina Bluff	Pine Bluff VA Clinic
Community Based Outpatient Clinic	Pocahontas	Pocahontas VA Clinic
Community Based Outpatient Clinic	Russellville	Russellville VA Clinic
Community Based Outpatient Clinic	Searcy	Searcy VA Clinic
Community Based Outpatient Clinic	Texarkana	Texarkana VA Clinic

== C ==
=== California ===
Service	City	Facility
VA Medical Center	Fresno	Fresno VA Medical Center
VA Medical Center	Livermore	Palo Alto VA Medical Center – Livermore
VA Medical Center	Loma Linda	Jerry L. Pettis Memorial Veterans' Hospital
VA Medical Center	Long Beach	VA Long Beach Healthcare System
VA Medical Center	Los Angeles	West Los Angeles VA Medical Center
VA Medical Center	Martinez	Martinez VA Medical Center
VA Medical Center	Mather	Sacramento VA Medical Center
VA Medical Center	Menlo Park	Palo Alto VA Medical Center – Menlo Park
VA Medical Center	Palo Alto	Palo Alto VA Medical Center
VA Medical Center	San Diego	Jennifer Moreno Department of Veterans Affairs Medical Center
VA Medical Center	San Francisco	San Francisco VA Medical Center
Domiciliary	San Diego	San Diego VA Domiciliary
Outpatient Clinic	Atwater	VA Castle Outpatient Clinic
Outpatient Clinic	Auburn	Sierra Foothills Outpatient Clinic
Outpatient Clinic	Los Angeles	VA Los Angeles West Ambulatory Care Center
Outpatient Clinic	Marina	Major General William H. Gourley VA-DoD Outpatient Clinic
Outpatient Clinic	McClellan	McClellan VA Clinic
Outpatient Clinic	North Hills	VA Sepulveda Ambulatory Care Center
Outpatient Clinic	Oceanside	Oceanside VA Clinic
Outpatient Clinic	Redding	Reading Outpatient Clinic
Outpatient Clinic	San Jose	San Jose VA Clinic
Outpatient Clinic	Ventura	Captain Rosemary Bryant Mariner Outpatient Clinic
Community Based Outpatient Clinic	Anaheim	Anaheim VA Clinic
Community Based Outpatient Clinic	Bakersfield	Bakersfield VA Clinic
Community Based Outpatient Clinic	Blythe	Blythe VA Clinic
Community Based Outpatient Clinic	Brawley	Imperial Valley
Community Based Outpatient Clinic	Capitola	Capitola VA Clinic
Community Based Outpatient Clinic	Chico	Chico VA Clinic
Community Based Outpatient Clinic	Chula Vista	Chula Vista VA Clinic
Community Based Outpatient Clinic	Clearlake	Clearlake VA Clinic
Community Based Outpatient Clinic	Commerce	East Los Angeles VA Clinic
Community Based Outpatient Clinic	Corona	Corona VA Clinic
Community Based Outpatient Clinic	El Centro	Imperial Valley VA Clinic
Community Based Outpatient Clinic	Escondido	Escondido VA Clinic
Community Based Outpatient Clinic	Eureka	Eureka VA Clinic
Community Based Outpatient Clinic	Fremont	Fremont VA Clinic
Community Based Outpatient Clinic	French Camp	Richard A. Pittman VA Clinic
Community Based Outpatient Clinic	Laguna Hills	Laguna Hills VA Clinic
Community Based Outpatient Clinic	Lancaster	Antelope Valley VA Clinic
Community Based Outpatient Clinic	Long Beach	Cabrillo VA Clinic
Community Based Outpatient Clinic	Los Angeles	Los Angeles VA Clinic
Community Based Outpatient Clinic	Mare Island	Mare Island VA Clinic
Community Based Outpatient Clinic	Merced	Merced VA Clinic
Community Based Outpatient Clinic	Modesto	Modesto VA Clinic
Community Based Outpatient Clinic	Murrieta	Murrieta VA Clinic
Community Based Outpatient Clinic	Oakhurst	Oakhurst VA Clinic
Community Based Outpatient Clinic	Oakland	Oakland VA Clinic
Community Based Outpatient Clinic	Oakland	Twenty First Street VA Clinic
Community Based Outpatient Clinic	Oxnard	Oxnard VA Clinic
Community Based Outpatient Clinic	Palm Desert	Palm Desert VA Clinic
Community Based Outpatient Clinic	Rancho Cucamonga	Rancho Cucamonga VA Clinic
Community Based Outpatient Clinic	Rancho Murieta	Rancho Murieta VA Clinic
Community Based Outpatient Clinic	Redlands	Redlands Blvd. VA Clinic
Community Based Outpatient Clinic	San Bruno	San Bruno VA Clinic
Community Based Outpatient Clinic	San Diego	Mission Valley VA Clinic
Community Based Outpatient Clinic	San Diego	Rio VA Clinic
Community Based Outpatient Clinic	San Diego	Sorrento Valley Clinic
Community Based Outpatient Clinic	San Francisco	San Francisco VA Clinic
Community Based Outpatient Clinic	San Luis Obispo	San Luis Obispo VA Clinic
Community Based Outpatient Clinic	Santa Ana	Santa Ana VA Clinic
Community Based Outpatient Clinic	Santa Barbara	Santa Barbara VA Clinic
Community Based Outpatient Clinic	Santa Fe Springs	Santa Fe Springs VA Clinic
Community Based Outpatient Clinic	Santa Maria	Santa Maria VA Clinic
Community Based Outpatient Clinic	Santa Rosa	Santa Rosa VA Clinic
Community Based Outpatient Clinic	Sonora	Sonora VA Clinic
Community Based Outpatient Clinic	Susanville	Diamond View VA Clinic
Community Based Outpatient Clinic	Travis Air Force Base	Fairfield VA Clinic
Community Based Outpatient Clinic	Tulare	Tulare VA Clinic
Community Based Outpatient Clinic	Ukiah	Ukiah VA Clinic
Community Based Outpatient Clinic	Victorville	Victorville VA Clinic
Community Based Outpatient Clinic	Yreka	Yreka VA Clinic
Community Based Outpatient Clinic	Yuba City	Yuba City VA Clinic

=== Colorado ===
Service	City	Facility
VA Medical Center	Aurora	VA Eastern Colorado Health Care System – Rocky Mountain Regional VA Medical Center
VA Medical Center	Grand Junction	VA Western Colorado Health Care System – Grand Junction VA Medical Center
Outpatient Clinic	Aurora	Jewell VA Clinic
Outpatient Clinic	Colorado Springs	PFC Floyd K. Lindstrom Department of Veterans Affairs Clinic
Community Based Outpatient Clinic	Alamosa	Alamosa VA Clinic
Community Based Outpatient Clinic	Aurora	VA Eastern Colorado Health Care System – Aurora VA Clinic
Community Based Outpatient Clinic	Burlington	Burlington VA Clinic
Community Based Outpatient Clinic	Craig	Major William Edward Adams Department of Veterans Affairs Clinic
Community Based Outpatient Clinic	Denver	Denver VA Clinic
Community Based Outpatient Clinic	Durango	Durango VA Clinic
Community Based Outpatient Clinic	Fort Collins	Fort Collins VA Clinic
Community Based Outpatient Clinic	Glenwood Springs	Glenwood Springs VA Clinic
Community Based Outpatient Clinic	Golden	Golden VA Clinic
Community Based Outpatient Clinic	La Junta	La Junta VA Clinic
Community Based Outpatient Clinic	Lamar	Lamar VA Clinic
Community Based Outpatient Clinic	Loveland	Loveland VA Clinic
Community Based Outpatient Clinic	Montrose	Montrose VA Clinic
Community Based Outpatient Clinic	Pueblo	PFC James Dunn VA Clinic
Community Based Outpatient Clinic	Salida	Salida VA Clinic
Community Based Outpatient Clinic	Sterling	Sterling VA Clinic

=== Connecticut ===
Service	City	Facility
VA Medical Center	West Haven	West Haven VA Medical Center
Outpatient Clinic	Newington	Newington VA Clinic
Community Based Outpatient Clinic	Danbury	Danbury VA Clinic
Community Based Outpatient Clinic	New London	John J. McGuirk Department of Veterans Affairs Outpatient Clinic
Community Based Outpatient Clinic	Orange	Orange VA Clinic
Community Based Outpatient Clinic	Stamford	Stamford VA Clinic
Community Based Outpatient Clinic	Waterbury	Waterbury VA Clinic
Community Based Outpatient Clinic	West Haven	Errera VA Clinic
Community Based Outpatient Clinic	Willimantic	Willimantic VA Clinic
Community Based Outpatient Clinic	Winsted	Winsted VA Clinic

== D ==
=== Delaware ===
Service	City	Facility
VA Medical Center	Wilmington	Wilmington VA Medical Center
Community Based Outpatient Clinic	Dover	Kent County VA Clinic
Community Based Outpatient Clinic	Georgetown	Sussex County VA Clinic

=== District of Columbia ===
Service	City	Facility
VA Medical Center	Washington	Washington VA Medical Center
Community Based Outpatient Clinic	Washington	Franklin Street VA Clinic
Community Based Outpatient Clinic	Washington	Southeast Washington VA Clinic

== F ==
=== Florida ===
Service	City	Facility
VA Medical Center	Bay Pines	Bay Pines VA Healthcare System – C.W. Bill Young VA Medical Center
VA Medical Center	Gainesville	Malcom Randall Department of Veterans Affairs Medical Center
VA Medical Center	Lake City	Lake City VA Medical Center
VA Medical Center	Miami	Bruce W. Carter Department of Veterans Affairs Medical Center
VA Medical Center	Orlando	Orlando VA Medical Center
VA Medical Center	Tampa	James A. Haley VA Medical Center
VA Medical Center	West Palm Beach	Thomas H. Corey VA Medical Center
VA/DoD Medical Center	Naval Air Station Jacksonville	Jacksonville Navy VA Medical Center
Domiciliary	Miami	Miami Flagler VA Clinic
Outpatient Clinic	Cape Coral	Lee County VA Clinic
Outpatient Clinic	Daytona Beach	William V. Chappell, Jr. Veterans' Outpatient Clinic
Outpatient Clinic	Jacksonville	Jacksonville 1 Outpatient Clinic
Outpatient Clinic	New Port Richey	New Port Richey Outpatient Clinic
Outpatient Clinic	Orlando	Lake Baldwin VA Clinic
Outpatient Clinic	Sunrise	William "Bill" Kling VA Clinic
Outpatient Clinic	Tallahassee	Sergeant Ernest I. "Boots" Thomas VA Clinic
Outpatient Clinic	The Villages	The Villages VA Clinic
Outpatient Clinic	Viera	Viera VA Clinic
Community Based Outpatient Clinic	Boca Raton	Boca Raton VA Clinic
Community Based Outpatient Clinic	Bradenton	Bradenton VA Clinic
Community Based Outpatient Clinic	Brooksville	Brooksville VA Clinic
Community Based Outpatient Clinic	Clermont	Clermont VA Clinic
Community Based Outpatient Clinic	Deerfield Beach	Deerfield Beach VA Clinic
Community Based Outpatient Clinic	Delray Beach	Delray Beach VA Clinic
Community Based Outpatient Clinic	Deltona	Deltona VA Clinic
Community Based Outpatient Clinic	Eglin Air Force Base	Eglin Air Force Base VA Clinic
Community Based Outpatient Clinic	Fort Pierce	Fort Pierce VA Clinic
Community Based Outpatient Clinic	Gainesville	Gainesville Ninety Eighth Street VA Clinic
Community Based Outpatient Clinic	Gainesville	Gainesville Sixteenth Street VA Clinic
Community Based Outpatient Clinic	Gainesville	Gainesville Sixty Fourth Street 3 VA Clinic
Community Based Outpatient Clinic	Gainesville	Twenty Third Avenue VA Clinic
Community Based Outpatient Clinic	Hollywood	Hollywood VA Clinic
Community Based Outpatient Clinic	Hollywood	Pembroke Pines VA Clinic
Community Based Outpatient Clinic	Homestead	Homestead VA Clinic
Community Based Outpatient Clinic	Jacksonville	Southpoint Clinic
Community Based Outpatient Clinic	Key Largo	Key Largo VA Clinic
Community Based Outpatient Clinic	Key West	Key West VA Clinic
Community Based Outpatient Clinic	Kissimmee	Kissimmee VA Clinic
Community Based Outpatient Clinic	Lakeland	Lakeland VA Clinic
Community Based Outpatient Clinic	Lake City	Lake City VA Clinic
Community Based Outpatient Clinic	Lecanto	Lecanto VA Clinic
Community Based Outpatient Clinic	Marianna	Marianna VA Clinic
Community Based Outpatient Clinic	Middleburg	A.K. Baker VA Clinic
Community Based Outpatient Clinic	Naples	Naples VA Clinic
Community Based Outpatient Clinic	Ocala	Ocala VA Clinic
Community Based Outpatient Clinic	Okeechobee	Okeechobee VA Clinic
Community Based Outpatient Clinic	Palatka	Palatka VA Clinic
Community Based Outpatient Clinic	Palm Bay	Palm Bay VA Clinic
Community Based Outpatient Clinic	Palm Harbor	Palm Harbor VA Clinic
Community Based Outpatient Clinic	Panama City Beach	Panama City Beach VA Clinic
Community Based Outpatient Clinic	Pensacola	Pensacola VA Clinic
Community Based Outpatient Clinic	Perry	Perry VA Clinic
Community Based Outpatient Clinic	Port Charlotte	Port Charlotte VA Clinic
Community Based Outpatient Clinic	Port Orange	Port Orange VA Clinic
Community Based Outpatient Clinic	Port St. Locie	Port Saint Lucie VA Clinic
Community Based Outpatient Clinic	Riverview	South Hillsborough VA Clinic
Community Based Outpatient Clinic	Sarasota	Sarasota VA Clinic
Community Based Outpatient Clinic	Sebring	Sebring VA Clinic
Community Based Outpatient Clinic	St. Augustine	PFC Leo C. Chase Jr. VA Clinic
Community Based Outpatient Clinic	St. Petersburg	St. Petersburg VA Clinic
Community Based Outpatient Clinic	Stuart	Stuart VA Clinic
Community Based Outpatient Clinic	Tampa	Bruce B. Downs Boulevard VA Clinic
Community Based Outpatient Clinic	Tampa	Forty Sixth Street North VA Clinic
Community Based Outpatient Clinic	Tampa	Hidden River VA Clinic
Community Based Outpatient Clinic	Tavares	Tavares VA Clinic
Community Based Outpatient Clinic	Vero Beach	Vero Beach VA Clinic
Community Based Outpatient Clinic	Winter Park	Crossroads VA Clinic
Community Based Outpatient Clinic	Zephyrhills	Medical View Lane VA Clinic

A seventh VA Medical Center for Florida has been confirmed for construction in Orlando. It may be ready as early as 2011.

== G ==
=== Georgia ===
Service	City	Facility
VA Medical Center	Augusta	Charlie Norwood VA Medical Center
VA Medical Center	Decatur	Joseph Maxwell Cleland Atlanta VA Medical Center
VA Medical Center	Dublin	Carl Vinson VA Medical Center
Outpatient Clinic	Carrollton	Trinka Davis Veterans Village
Community Based Outpatient Clinic	Albany	Albany VA Clinic
Community Based Outpatient Clinic	Athens	Athens VA Clinic
Community Based Outpatient Clinic	Athens	Athens Baxter Street VA Clinic
Community Based Outpatient Clinic	Atlanta	Henderson Mill VA Clinic
Community Based Outpatient Clinic	Atlanta	North Fulton County VA Clinic
Community Based Outpatient Clinic	Atlanta	Fort McPherson VA Clinic
Community Based Outpatient Clinic	Austell	Austell VA Clinic
Community Based Outpatient Clinic	Blairsville	Blairsville VA Clinic
Community Based Outpatient Clinic	Brookhaven	North DeKalb County VA Clinic
Community Based Outpatient Clinic	Brunswick	Brunswick VA Clinic
Community Based Outpatient Clinic	College Park	South Fulton County VA Clinic
Community Based Outpatient Clinic	Columbus	Robert S. Poydasheff VA Clinic
Community Based Outpatient Clinic	Columbus	Columbus Downtown VA Clinic
Community Based Outpatient Clinic	Decatur	Atlanta VA Clinic
Community Based Outpatient Clinic	Covington	Covington VA Clinic
Community Based Outpatient Clinic	East Point	East Point VA Clinic
Community Based Outpatient Clinic	East Point	Fulton County VA Clinic
Community Based Outpatient Clinic	Flowery Branch	Oakwood VA Clinic
Community Based Outpatient Clinic	Fort Benning	Fort Benning VA Clinic
Community Based Outpatient Clinic	Hinesville	Hinesville VA Clinic
Community Based Outpatient Clinic	Kathleen	Perry VA Clinic
Community Based Outpatient Clinic	Jasper	Pickens County VA Clinic
Community Based Outpatient Clinic	Lawrenceville	Gwinnett County VA Clinic
Community Based Outpatient Clinic	Lawrenceville	Lawrenceville VA Clinic
Community Based Outpatient Clinic	Macon	Macon VA Clinic
Community Based Outpatient Clinic	Marietta	Cobb County VA Clinic
Community Based Outpatient Clinic	Milledgeville	Milledgeville VA Clinic
Community Based Outpatient Clinic	Newnan	Newnan VA Clinic
Community Based Outpatient Clinic	Rome	Rome Clinic
Community Based Outpatient Clinic	Savannah	Savannah VA Clinic
Community Based Outpatient Clinic	Smyrna	South Cobb County VA Clinic
Community Based Outpatient Clinic	Statesboro	Ray Hendrix Department of Veterans Affairs Clinic
Community Based Outpatient Clinic	St. Marys	St. Marys VA Clinic
Community Based Outpatient Clinic	Stockbridge	Stockbridge VA Clinic
Community Based Outpatient Clinic	Tifton	Tifton VA Clinic
Community Based Outpatient Clinic	Valdosta	Valdosta VA Clinic
Community Based Outpatient Clinic	Waycross	Waycross VA Clinic

=== Guam ===
Service	City	Facility
Community Based Outpatient Clinic	Agana Heights	Guam VA Clinic
Community Based Outpatient Clinic	Dededo	Guam CBOC Annex

== H ==
=== Hawaii ===
Service	City	Facility
VA Medical Center	Honolulu	Spark M. Matsunaga Department of Veterans Affairs Medical Center
Community Based Outpatient Clinic	Hilo	Hilo VA Clinic
Community Based Outpatient Clinic	Kahului	Maui VA Clinic
Community Based Outpatient Clinic	Kaneohe	Windward VA Clinic
Community Based Outpatient Clinic	Kapolei	Daniel K. Akaka VA Clinic
Community Based Outpatient Clinic	Kailua-Kona	Kailua-Kona VA Clinic
Community Based Outpatient Clinic	Kaunakakai	Molokai VA Clinic
Community Based Outpatient Clinic	Lanai City	Lanai VA Clinic
Community Based Outpatient Clinic	Lihue	Lihue VA Clinic

== I ==
=== Idaho ===
Service	City	Facility
VA Medical Center	Boise	Boise VA Medical Center
Community Based Outpatient Clinic	Caldwell	Caldwell VA Clinic
Community Based Outpatient Clinic	Coeur d'Alene	North Idaho Coeur d 'Alene VA Clinic
Community Based Outpatient Clinic	Grangeville	Grangeville VA Outpatient Clinic
Community Based Outpatient Clinic	Lewiston	Lewiston VA Clinic
Community Based Outpatient Clinic	Mountain Home	Mountain Home VA Clinic
Community Based Outpatient Clinic	Pocatello	Pocatello VA Clinic
Community Based Outpatient Clinic	Ponderay	Sandpoint VA Clinic
Community Based Outpatient Clinic	Salmon	Salmon VA Clinic
Community Based Outpatient Clinic	Twin Falls	Twin Falls VA Clinic

=== Illinois ===
Service	City	Facility
VA Medical Center	Chicago	Jesse Brown VA Medical Center
VA Medical Center	Danville	Danville VA Medical Center
VA Medical Center	Hines	Edward Hines Junior Hospital
VA Medical Center	Marion	Marion VA Medical Center
VA/DoD Medical Center	North Chicago	Captain James A. Lovell Federal Health Care Center
Community Based Outpatient Clinic	Bloomington	Bloomington VA Clinic
Community Based Outpatient Clinic	Bourbonnais	Kankakee County VA Clinic
Community Based Outpatient Clinic	Carbondale	Carbondale VA Clinic
Community Based Outpatient Clinic	Chicago	Auburn Gresham VA Clinic
Community Based Outpatient Clinic	Chicago	Lakeside VA Clinic
Community Based Outpatient Clinic	Chicago Heights	Chicago Heights VA Clinic
Community Based Outpatient Clinic	Decatur	Decatur VA Clinic
Community Based Outpatient Clinic	Effingham	Effingham VA Clinic
Community Based Outpatient Clinic	Evanston	Evanston VA Clinic
Community Based Outpatient Clinic	Freeport	Freeport VA Clinic
Community Based Outpatient Clinic	Galesburg	Lane A. Evans VA Community Based Outpatient Clinic
Community Based Outpatient Clinic	Hoffman Estates	Hoffman Estates VA Clinic
Community Based Outpatient Clinic	Joliet	Joliet VA Clinic
Community Based Outpatient Clinic	Harrisburg	Harrisburg VA Clinic
Community Based Outpatient Clinic	Marion	Heartland Street VA Clinic
Community Based Outpatient Clinic	Mattoon	Mattoon VA Clinic
Community Based Outpatient Clinic	McHenry	McHenry VA Clinic
Community Based Outpatient Clinic	Mount Vernon	Mount Vernon VA Clinic
Community Based Outpatient Clinic	North Aurora	Aurora VA Clinic
Community Based Outpatient Clinic	Peoria	Bob Michel Department of Veterans Affairs Outpatient Clinic
Community Based Outpatient Clinic	Peru	LaSalle VA Clinic
Community Based Outpatient Clinic	Oak Lawn	Oak Lawn VA Clinic
Community Based Outpatient Clinic	Quincy	Quincy VA Clinic
Community Based Outpatient Clinic	Rockford	Rockford VA Clinic
Community Based Outpatient Clinic	Scott Air Force Base	Scott Air Force Base VA Clinic
Community Based Outpatient Clinic	Shiloh	St. Clair County VA Clinic
Community Based Outpatient Clinic	Springfield	Springfield VA Clinic
Community Based Outpatient Clinic	Sterling	Sterling VA Clinic

=== Indiana ===
Service	City	Facility
VA Medical Center	Fort Wayne	VA Northern Indiana Health Care System – Fort Wayne Campus
VA Medical Center	Indianapolis	Richard L. Roudebush VA Medical Center
VA Medical Center	Marion	VA Northern Indiana Health Care System – Marion Campus
Outpatient Clinic	Crown Point	Adam Benjamin Jr. Outpatient Clinic
Outpatient Clinic	Evansville	Evansville Health Care Center
Community Based Outpatient Clinic	Bloomington	Bloomington VA Clinic
Community Based Outpatient Clinic	Bloomington	Monroe County VA Clinic
Community Based Outpatient Clinic	Brownsburg	Brownsburg VA Clinic
Community Based Outpatient Clinic	Edinburgh	Wakeman VA Clinic
Community Based Outpatient Clinic	Fort Wayne	Fort Wayne VA Clinic
Community Based Outpatient Clinic	Goshen	Goshen VA Clinic
Community Based Outpatient Clinic	Greendale	Dearborn VA Clinic
Community Based Outpatient Clinic	Indianapolis	Cold Spring Road VA Clinic
Community Based Outpatient Clinic	Indianapolis	Indianapolis VA Clinic
Community Based Outpatient Clinic	Indianapolis	Indianapolis YMCA VA Clinic
Community Based Outpatient Clinic	Lafayette	Lafayette VA Clinic
Community Based Outpatient Clinic	Martinsville	Martinsville VA Clinic
Community Based Outpatient Clinic	Mishawaka	St. Joseph County VA Clinic
Community Based Outpatient Clinic	Muncie	Muncie VA Clinic
Community Based Outpatient Clinic	New Albany	New Albany VA Clinic
Community Based Outpatient Clinic	Peru	Hoosier VA Clinic
Community Based Outpatient Clinic	Richmond	Richmond VA Clinic
Community Based Outpatient Clinic	Shelbyville	Shelbyville VA Clinic
Community Based Outpatient Clinic	Scottsburg	Scott County VA Clinic
Community Based Outpatient Clinic	South Bend	Columbia Place VA Clinic
Community Based Outpatient Clinic	Terre Haute	Terre Haute VA Clinic
Community Based Outpatient Clinic	Vincennes	Vincennes VA Clinic
Community Based Outpatient Clinic	West Lafayette	West Lafayette VA Clinic

=== Iowa ===
Service	City	Facility
VA Medical Center	Des Moines	Des Moines VA Medical Center
VA Medical Center	Iowa City	Iowa City VA Medical Center
Community Based Outpatient Clinic	Burlington	Burlington VA Clinic
Community Based Outpatient Clinic	Carroll	Carroll VA Clinic
Community Based Outpatient Clinic	Cedar Rapids	Cedar Rapids VA Clinic
Community Based Outpatient Clinic	Cedar Rapids	Linn County VA Clinic
Community Based Outpatient Clinic	Coralville	Coralville VA Clinic
Community Based Outpatient Clinic	Davenport	Davenport VA Clinic
Community Based Outpatient Clinic	Davenport	Quad Cities VA Clinic
Community Based Outpatient Clinic	Decorah	Decorah VA Clinic
Community Based Outpatient Clinic	Des Moines	Des Moines VA Clinic
Community Based Outpatient Clinic	Des Moines	South Des Moines VA Clinic
Community Based Outpatient Clinic	Dubuque	Dubuque VA Clinic
Community Based Outpatient Clinic	Fort Dodge	Fort Dodge VA Clinic
Community Based Outpatient Clinic	Iowa City	Iowa City VA Clinic
Community Based Outpatient Clinic	Knoxville	Knoxville VA Clinic
Community Based Outpatient Clinic	Marshalltown	Marshalltown VA Clinic
Community Based Outpatient Clinic	Mason City	Mason City VA Clinic
Community Based Outpatient Clinic	Ottumwa	Ottumwa VA Clinic
Community Based Outpatient Clinic	Shenandoah	Shenandoah VA Clinic
Community Based Outpatient Clinic	Sioux City	Sioux City VA Clinic
Community Based Outpatient Clinic	Spirit Lake	Spirit Lake VA Clinic
Community Based Outpatient Clinic	Waterloo	Waterloo VA Clinic

== K ==
=== Kansas ===
Service	City	Facility
VA Medical Center	Leavenworth	VA Eastern Kansas Health Care System – Dwight D. Eisenhower VA Medical Center
VA Medical Center	Topeka	VA Eastern Kansas Health Care System – Colmery-O'Neil VA Medical Center
VA Medical Center	Wichita	Robert J. Dole VA Medical Center
Community Based Outpatient Clinic	Chanute	Chanute VA Clinic
Community Based Outpatient Clinic	Fort Dodge	Dodge City VA Clinic
Community Based Outpatient Clinic	Fort Scott	Fort Scott VA Clinic
Community Based Outpatient Clinic	Garnett	Garnett VA Clinic
Community Based Outpatient Clinic	Hays	Hays VA Clinic
Community Based Outpatient Clinic	Hutchinson	Hutchinson VA Clinic
Community Based Outpatient Clinic	Junction City	Richard J. Seitz CBOC
Community Based Outpatient Clinic	Kansas City	Wyandotte County VA Clinic
Community Based Outpatient Clinic	Lawrence	Lawrence VA Clinic
Community Based Outpatient Clinic	Liberal	Liberal VA Clinic
Community Based Outpatient Clinic	Paola	Paola VA Clinic
Community Based Outpatient Clinic	Parsons	Parsons VA Clinic
Community Based Outpatient Clinic	Salina	Salina VA Clinic
Community Based Outpatient Clinic	Shawnee	Johnson County VA Clinic
Community Based Outpatient Clinic	Wichita	Sedgwick County VA Clinic

=== Kentucky ===
Service	City	Facility
VA Medical Center	Fort Thomas	Cincinnati VA Medical Center-Fort Thomas
VA Medical Center	Lexington	Lexington VA Health Care System – Franklin R. Sousley Campus
VA Medical Center	Lexington	Lexington VA Health Care System – Troy Bowling Campus
VA Medical Center	Louisville	Robley Rex VA Medical Center
Outpatient Clinic	Louisville	VA Healthcare Center, TRICARE Family Practice
Community Based Outpatient Clinic	Bellevue	Bellevue VA Clinic
Community Based Outpatient Clinic	Berea	Berea VA Clinic
Community Based Outpatient Clinic	Bowling Green	Bowling Green VA Clinic
Community Based Outpatient Clinic	Carrollton	Carrollton VA Clinic
Community Based Outpatient Clinic	Clarkson	Grayson County VA Clinic
Community Based Outpatient Clinic	Florence	Florence VA Clinic
Community Based Outpatient Clinic	Fort Campbell	Fort Campbell VA Clinic
Community Based Outpatient Clinic	Fort Knox	Fort Knox VA Clinic
Community Based Outpatient Clinic	Hazard	Hazard VA Clinic
Community Based Outpatient Clinic	Hopkinsville	Hopkinsville VA Clinic
Community Based Outpatient Clinic	Louisville	Greenwood VA Clinic
Community Based Outpatient Clinic	Louisville	Newburg VA Clinic
Community Based Outpatient Clinic	Louisville	Stonybrook VA Clinic
Community Based Outpatient Clinic	Madisonville	Madisonville VA Clinic
Community Based Outpatient Clinic	Mayfield	Mayfield VA Clinic
Community Based Outpatient Clinic	Morehead	Morehead VA Clinic
Community Based Outpatient Clinic	Owensboro	Owensboro VA Clinic
Community Based Outpatient Clinic	Paducah	Paducah VA Clinic
Community Based Outpatient Clinic	Prestonsburg	Prestonsburg VA Clinic
Community Based Outpatient Clinic	Somerset	Somerset VA Clinic

== L ==
=== Louisiana ===
Service	City	Facility
VA Medical Center	Pineville	Alexandria VA Medical Center
VA Medical Center	New Orleans	New Orleans VA Medical Center
VA Medical Center	Shreveport	Overton Brooks VA Medical Center
Outpatient Clinic	Baton Rouge	Baton Rouge VA Clinic
Community Based Outpatient Clinic	Baton Rouge	Baton Rouge VA Clinic South
Community Based Outpatient Clinic	Bogalusa	Bogalusa VA Clinic
Community Based Outpatient Clinic	Franklin	Franklin VA Clinic
Community Based Outpatient Clinic	Hammond	Hammond VA Clinic
Community Based Outpatient Clinic	Houma	Houma VA Clinic
Community Based Outpatient Clinic	Jennings	Jennings VA Clinic
Community Based Outpatient Clinic	Lafayette	Lafayette Campus B VA Clinic
Community Based Outpatient Clinic	Lafayette	Lafayette VA Clinic
Community Based Outpatient Clinic	Lake Charles	Douglas Fournet Department of Veterans Affairs Clinic
Community Based Outpatient Clinic	Lessville	Fort Johnson VA Clinic
Community Based Outpatient Clinic	Monroe	Monroe VA Clinic
Community Based Outpatient Clinic	Natchitoches	Natchitoches VA Clinic
Community Based Outpatient Clinic	Reserve	St. John VA Clinic
Community Based Outpatient Clinic	Shreveport	Knight Street VA Clinic
Community Based Outpatient Clinic	Slidell	Slidell VA Clinic

== M ==
=== Maine ===
Service	City	Facility
VA Medical Center	Augusta	Togus VA Medical Center
Community Based Outpatient Clinic	Bangor	Bangor VA Clinic
Community Based Outpatient Clinic	Bingham	Bingham Access Point
Community Based Outpatient Clinic	Calais	Calais VA Clinic
Community Based Outpatient Clinic	Caribou	Caribou VA Clinic
Community Based Outpatient Clinic	Fort Kent	Fort Kent VA Clinic
Community Based Outpatient Clinic	Houlton	Houlton VA Clinic
Community Based Outpatient Clinic	Lewiston	Lewiston VA Clinic
Community Based Outpatient Clinic	Lincoln	Lincoln VA Clinic
Community Based Outpatient Clinic	Portland	Portland VA Clinic
Community Based Outpatient Clinic	Rumford	Rumford VA Clinic
Community Based Outpatient Clinic	Saco	Saco VA Clinic

=== Maryland ===
Service	City	Facility
VA Medical Center	Baltimore	Baltimore VA Medical Center
VA Medical Center	Baltimore	Loch Raven VA Medical Center
VA Medical Center	Perry Point	Perry Point VA Medical Center
Community Based Outpatient Clinic	Baltimore	Baltimore VA Clinic
Community Based Outpatient Clinic	Cambridge	Cambridge VA Clinic
Community Based Outpatient Clinic	Fort Meade	Fort Meade VA Clinic
Community Based Outpatient Clinic	Glen Burnie	Glen Burnie VA Clinic
Community Based Outpatient Clinic	Pocomoke City	Pocomoke City VA Clinic
Community Based Outpatient Clinic	Rosedale	Eastern Baltimore County VA Clinic

=== Massachusetts ===
Service	City	Facility
VA Medical Center	Bedford	Edith Nourse Rogers Memorial Veterans Hospital
VA Medical Center	Boston	Jamaica Plain VA Medical Center
VA Medical Center	Brockton	Brockton VA Medical Center
VA Medical Center	Leeds	Edward P. Boland Department of Veterans Affairs Medical Center
VA Medical Center	West Roxbury	West Roxbury VA Medical Center
Community Based Outpatient Clinic	Boston	Causeway VA Clinic
Community Based Outpatient Clinic	Fitchburg	Fitchburg VA Clinic
Community Based Outpatient Clinic	Framingham	Framingham VA Clinic
Community Based Outpatient Clinic	Gloucester	Gloucester VA Clinic
Community Based Outpatient Clinic	Greenfield	Greenfield VA Clinic
Community Based Outpatient Clinic	Haverhill	Haverhill VA Clinic
Community Based Outpatient Clinic	Hyannis	Hyannis VA Clinic
Community Based Outpatient Clinic	Lowell	Lowell VA Clinic
Community Based Outpatient Clinic	Lynn	Lynn VA Clinic
Community Based Outpatient Clinic	New Bedford	New Bedford VA Clinic
Community Based Outpatient Clinic	Pittsfield	Pittsfield VA Clinic
Community Based Outpatient Clinic	Plymouth	Plymouth VA Clinic
Community Based Outpatient Clinic	Quincy	Quincy VA Clinic
Community Based Outpatient Clinic	Springfield	Springfield VA Clinic
Community Based Outpatient Clinic	Worcester	Plantation Street VA Clinic
Community Based Outpatient Clinic	Worcester	Worcester VA Clinic

=== Michigan ===
Service	City	Facility
VA Medical Center	Ann Arbor	Lieutenant Colonel Charles S. Kettles VA Medical Center
VA Medical Center	Battle Creek	Battle Creek VA Medical Center
VA Medical Center	Detroit	John D. Dingell VA Medical Center
VA Medical Center	Iron Mountain	Oscar G. Johnson VA Medical Center
VA Medical Center	Saginaw	Aleda E. Lutz VA Medical Center
Outpatient Clinic	Wyoming	Wyoming VA Clinic
Community Based Outpatient Clinic	Alpena	Lieutenant Colonel Clement C. Van Wagoner Department of Veterans Affairs Clinic
Community Based Outpatient Clinic	Bad Axe	Bad Axe VA Clinic
Community Based Outpatient Clinic	Benton Harbor	Benton Harbor VA Clinic
Community Based Outpatient Clinic	Cadillac	Cadillac VA Clinic
Community Based Outpatient Clinic	Clare	Clare VA Clinic
Community Based Outpatient Clinic	Flint	Flint VA Clinic
Community Based Outpatient Clinic	Gaylord	Gaylord VA Clinic
Community Based Outpatient Clinic	Grayling	Grayling VA Clinic
Community Based Outpatient Clinic	Hancock	Hancock VA Clinic
Community Based Outpatient Clinic	Ironwood	Ironwood VA Clinic
Community Based Outpatient Clinic	Lansing	Lansing South VA Clinic
Community Based Outpatient Clinic	Mackinaw City	Cheboygan County VA Clinic
Community Based Outpatient Clinic	Manistique	Manistique VA Clinic
Community Based Outpatient Clinic	Menominee	Menominee VA Clinic
Community Based Outpatient Clinic	Michigan Center	Jackson VA Clinic
Community Based Outpatient Clinic	Muskegon	Muskegon VA Clinic
Community Based Outpatient Clinic	Oscoda	Oscoda VA Clinic
Community Based Outpatient Clinic	Pontiac	Pontiac VA Clinic
Community Based Outpatient Clinic	Saginaw	Saginaw VA Clinic
Community Based Outpatient Clinic	Sault Saint Marie	Sault Saint Marie VA Clinic
Community Based Outpatient Clinic	Traverse City	Colonel Demas T. Craw VA Clinic
Community Based Outpatient Clinic	Yale	Yale VA Clinic

=== Minnesota ===
Service	City	Facility
VA Medical Center	Minneapolis	Minneapolis VA Medical Center
VA Medical Center	St. Cloud	St. Cloud VA Health Care System
Community Based Outpatient Clinic	Albert Lea	Albert Lea VA Clinic
Community Based Outpatient Clinic	Alexandra	Max J. Beilke Department of Veterans Affairs Outpatient Clinic
Community Based Outpatient Clinic	Bemidji	Bemidji VA Clinic
Community Based Outpatient Clinic	Brainerd	Brainerd VA Clinic
Community Based Outpatient Clinic	Ely	Ely VA Clinic
Community Based Outpatient Clinic	Fergus Falls	Fergus Falls VA Clinic
Community Based Outpatient Clinic	Fort Snelling	Fort Snelling VA Clinic
Community Based Outpatient Clinic	Hibbing	Hibbing VA Clinic
Community Based Outpatient Clinic	Mankato	Lyle C. Pearson CBOC
Community Based Outpatient Clinic	Maplewood	Maplewood VA Clinic
Community Based Outpatient Clinic	Minneapolis	Minneapolis VA Clinic
Community Based Outpatient Clinic	Montevideo	Montevideo VA Clinic
Community Based Outpatient Clinic	Ramsey	Northwest Metro VA Clinic
Community Based Outpatient Clinic	Rice Lake	Rice Lake VA Clinic
Community Based Outpatient Clinic	Rochester	Rochester VA Clinic
Community Based Outpatient Clinic	Shakopee	Shakopee VA Clinic
Community Based Outpatient Clinic	St. James	St. James VA Clinic

=== Mississippi ===
Service	City	Facility
VA Medical Center	Biloxi	Biloxi VA Medical Center
VA Medical Center	Jackson	G.V. "Sonny" Montgomery VA Medical Center
Community Based Outpatient Clinic	Columbus	Columbus VA Clinic
Community Based Outpatient Clinic	Greenville	Greenville VA Clinic
Community Based Outpatient Clinic	Hattiesburg	Hattiesburg VA Clinic
Community Based Outpatient Clinic	Holly Springs	Holly Springs VA Clinic
Community Based Outpatient Clinic	Kosciusko	Kosciusko VA Clinic
Community Based Outpatient Clinic	McComb	McComb VA Clinic
Community Based Outpatient Clinic	Meridian	Meridian VA Clinic
Community Based Outpatient Clinic	Natchez	Natchez VA Clinic
Community Based Outpatient Clinic	Tupelo	Tupelo VA Clinic

=== Missouri ===
Service	City	Facility
VA Medical Center	Columbia	Harry S. Truman Memorial Veterans' Hospital
VA Medical Center	Poplar Bluff	John J. Pershing VA Medical Center
VA Medical Center	Kansas City	Kansas City VA Medical Center
VA Medical Center	St. Louis	John J. Cochran Veterans Hospital
VA Medical Center	St. Louis	St. Louis VA Medical Center-Jefferson Barracks
Outpatient Clinic	Springfield	Gene Taylor Veterans' Outpatient Clinic
Community Based Outpatient Clinic	Belton	Belton VA Clinic
Community Based Outpatient Clinic	Branson	Branson VA Clinic
Community Based Outpatient Clinic	Camdenton	Camdenton VA Clinic
Community Based Outpatient Clinic	Cameron	Cameron VA Clinic
Community Based Outpatient Clinic	Cape Girardeau	Cape Girardeau VA Clinic
Community Based Outpatient Clinic	Excelsior Springs	Excelsior Springs VA Clinic
Community Based Outpatient Clinic	Farmington	Farmington VA Clinic
Community Based Outpatient Clinic	Florissant	St. Louis County VA Clinic
Community Based Outpatient Clinic	Jefferson City	Jefferson City VA Clinic
Community Based Outpatient Clinic	Kansas City	Honor VA Clinic
Community Based Outpatient Clinic	Kansas City	Mobile Medical Unit
Community Based Outpatient Clinic	Kirksville	Kirksville VA Clinic
Community Based Outpatient Clinic	Mexico	Mexico VA Clinic
Community Based Outpatient Clinic	Nevada	Nevada VA Clinic
Community Based Outpatient Clinic	O'Fallon	St. Charles County VA Clinic
Community Based Outpatient Clinic	Osage Beach	Lake of the Ozarks VA Clinic
Community Based Outpatient Clinic	Platte City	Platte City VA Clinic
Community Based Outpatient Clinic	Sedalia	Sedalia VA Clinic
Community Based Outpatient Clinic	Sikeston	Sikeston VA Clinic
Community Based Outpatient Clinic	St. James	St. James VA Clinic
Community Based Outpatient Clinic	St. Joseph	St. Joseph VA Clinic
Community Based Outpatient Clinic	St. Louis	Manchester Avenue VA Clinic
Community Based Outpatient Clinic	St. Louis	Olive Street VA Clinic
Community Based Outpatient Clinic	St. Louis	Washington Avenue VA Clinic
Community Based Outpatient Clinic	Warrensburg	Warrensburg VA Clinic
Community Based Outpatient Clinic	Washington	Franklin County VA Clinic
Community Based Outpatient Clinic	Waynesville	Fort Leonard Wood VA Clinic
Community Based Outpatient Clinic	West Plains	West Plains VA Clinic

=== Montana ===
Service	City	Facility
VA Medical Center	Fort Harrison	Fort Harrison VA Medical Center
Outpatient Clinic	Billings	Benjamin Charles Steele VA Clinic
Community Based Outpatient Clinic	Anaconda	Anaconda VA Clinic
Community Based Outpatient Clinic	Billings	Dr. Joseph Medicine Crow VA Clinic
Community Based Outpatient Clinic	Bozeman	Bozeman VA Clinic
Community Based Outpatient Clinic	Cut Bank	Cut Bank VA Clinic
Community Based Outpatient Clinic	Glasgow	Glasgow VA Clinic
Community Based Outpatient Clinic	Glendive	Glendive VA Clinic
Community Based Outpatient Clinic	Great Falls	Great Falls VA Clinic
Community Based Outpatient Clinic	Hamilton	Hamilton VA Clinic
Community Based Outpatient Clinic	Havre	Merril Lundman Department of Veterans Affairs Outpatient Clinic
Community Based Outpatient Clinic	Kalispell	Kalispell VA Clinic
Community Based Outpatient Clinic	Libby	Libby VA Clinic
Community Based Outpatient Clinic	Lewistown	Lewistown VA Clinic
Community Based Outpatient Clinic	Miles City	Miles City VA Community Living Center
Community Based Outpatient Clinic	Missoula	David J. Thatcher VA Clinic
Community Based Outpatient Clinic	Plentywood	Plentywood VA Clinic

== N ==
=== Nebraska ===
Service	City	Facility
VA Medical Center	Grand Island	Grand Island VA Medical Center
VA Medical Center	Omaha	VA Nebraska-Western Iowa Health Care System – Omaha VA Medical Center
Outpatient Clinic	Lincoln	Lincoln VA Clinic
Community Based Outpatient Clinic	Bellevue	Bellevue VA Clinic
Community Based Outpatient Clinic	Gordon	Gordon VA Clinic
Community Based Outpatient Clinic	Holdrege	Holdrege VA Clinic
Community Based Outpatient Clinic	Norfolk	Norfolk VA Clinic
Community Based Outpatient Clinic	North Platte	North Platte VA Clinic
Community Based Outpatient Clinic	O'Neill	O'Neill, CBOC
Community Based Outpatient Clinic	Scottsbluff	Scottsbluff VA Clinic
Community Based Outpatient Clinic	Sidney	Sidney VA Clinic

=== Nevada ===
Service	City	Facility
VA Medical Center	North Las Vegas	North Las Vegas VA Medical Center
VA Medical Center	Reno	Ioannis A. Lougaris Veterans' Administration Medical Center
VA/DoD Medical Center	Nellis Air Force Base	Mike O'Callaghan Federal Hospital
Outpatient Clinic	Henderson	Southeast Las Vegas VA Clinic
Outpatient Clinic	Las Vegas	Northeast Las Vegas VA Clinic
Outpatient Clinic	Las Vegas	Northwest Las Vegas VA Clinic
Outpatient Clinic	Las Vegas	Southwest Las Vegas VA Clinic
Community Based Outpatient Clinic	Elko	Elko VA Clinic
Community Based Outpatient Clinic	Fallon	Lahontan Valley VA Clinic
Community Based Outpatient Clinic	Gardnerville	Carson Valley VA Clinic
Community Based Outpatient Clinic	Laughlin	Master Chief Petty Officer Jesse Dean VA Clinic
Community Based Outpatient Clinic	Pahrump	Pahrump VA Clinic
Community Based Outpatient Clinic	Reno	Capitol Hill VA Clinic
Community Based Outpatient Clinic	Reno	Kietzke VA Clinic
Community Based Outpatient Clinic	Reno	North Reno VA Clinic
Community Based Outpatient Clinic	Reno	Reno East VA Clinic
Community Based Outpatient Clinic	Reno	Virginia Street VA Clinic
Community Based Outpatient Clinic	Winnemucca	Winnemucca VA Clinic

=== New Hampshire ===
Service	City	Facility
VA Medical Center	Manchester	Manchester VA Medical Center
Community Based Outpatient Clinic	Conway	Conway VA Clinic
Community Based Outpatient Clinic	Keene	Keene VA Clinic
Community Based Outpatient Clinic	Littleton	Littleton VA Clinic
Community Based Outpatient Clinic	Pease Air National Guard Base	Portsmouth VA Clinic
Community Based Outpatient Clinic	Somersworth	Somersworth VA Clinic
Community Based Outpatient Clinic	Tilton	Tilton VA Clinic

=== New Jersey ===
Service	City	Facility
VA Medical Center	East Orange	East Orange VA Medical Center
VA Medical Center	Lyons	Lyons VA Medical Center
Outpatient Clinic	Brick	James J. Howard Veterans' Outpatient Clinic
Outpatient Clinic	Toms River	Leonard G. ‘‘Bud’’ Lomell VA Clinic
Community Based Outpatient Clinic	Camden	Camden VA Clinic
Community Based Outpatient Clinic	Elizabeth	Elizabeth VA Clinic
Community Based Outpatient Clinic	Hackensack	Hackensack VA Clinic
Community Based Outpatient Clinic	Hamilton	Hamilton VA Clinic
Community Based Outpatient Clinic	Jersey City	Jersey City VA Clinic
Community Based Outpatient Clinic	Linwood	Atlantic County VA Clinic
Community Based Outpatient Clinic	Morristown	Morristown VA Clinic
Community Based Outpatient Clinic	Marlton	Burlington County VA Clinic
Community Based Outpatient Clinic	Morristown	Morristown VA Clinic
Community Based Outpatient Clinic	Paterson	Paterson VA Clinic
Community Based Outpatient Clinic	Piscataway	Piscataway VA Clinic
Community Based Outpatient Clinic	Rio Grande	Cape May County VA Clinic
Community Based Outpatient Clinic	Sewell	Gloucester County VA Clinic
Community Based Outpatient Clinic	Tinton Falls	Tinton Falls VA Clinic
Community Based Outpatient Clinic	Vineland	Cumberland County VA Clinic

=== New Mexico ===
Service	City	Facility
VA Medical Center	Albuquerque	New Mexico VA Health Care System – Raymond G. Murphy VA Medical Center
Community Based Outpatient Clinic	Alamogordo	Alamogordo VA Clinic
Community Based Outpatient Clinic	Artesia	Artesia VA Clinic
Community Based Outpatient Clinic	Clovis	Clovis VA Clinic
Community Based Outpatient Clinic	Española	Española VA Clinic
Community Based Outpatient Clinic	Farmington	Farmington VA Clinic
Community Based Outpatient Clinic	Gallup	Gallup VA Clinic
Community Based Outpatient Clinic	Hobbs	Hobbs VA Clinic
Community Based Outpatient Clinic	Las Cruces	Las Cruces VA Clinic
Community Based Outpatient Clinic	Las Vegas	Las Vegas VA Clinic
Community Based Outpatient Clinic	Raton	Raton VA Clinic
Community Based Outpatient Clinic	Rio Rancho	Northwest Metro VA Clinic
Community Based Outpatient Clinic	Santa Fe	Santa Fe VA Clinic
Community Based Outpatient Clinic	Silver City	Silver City VA Clinic
Community Based Outpatient Clinic	Taos	Taos VA Clinic
Community Based Outpatient Clinic	Truth or Consequences	Truth or Consequences VA Clinic

=== New York ===
Service	City	Facility
VA Medical Center	Albany	Samuel S. Stratton Albany VA Medical Center
VA Medical Center	Batavia	Batavia VA Medical Center
VA Medical Center	Bath	Bath VA Medical Center
VA Medical Center	Bronx	James J. Peters VA Medical Center
VA Medical Center	Brooklyn	Brooklyn VA Medical Center
VA Medical Center	Buffalo	Buffalo VA Medical Center
VA Medical Center	Canandaigua	Canandaigua VA Medical Center
VA Medical Center	Manhattan	Margaret Cochran Corbin VA Campus
VA Medical Center	Montrose	Franklin Delano Roosevelt Hospital
VA Medical Center	Northport	Northport VA Medical Center
VA Medical Center	Syracuse	Syracuse VA Medical Center
VA Medical Center	Wappingers Falls	Castle Point VA Medical Center
Domiciliary	Jamaica	St. Albans Community Living Center
Outpatient Clinic	Rochester	Rochester Calkins VA Clinic
Community Based Outpatient Clinic	Auburn	Auburn VA Clinic
Community Based Outpatient Clinic	Bainbridge	Bainbridge VA Clinic
Community Based Outpatient Clinic	Bay Shore	Bay Shore VA Clinic
Community Based Outpatient Clinic	Binghamton	Binghamton VA Clinic
Community Based Outpatient Clinic	Buffalo	Buffalo VA Clinic
Community Based Outpatient Clinic	Carmel	Carmel VA Clinic
Community Based Outpatient Clinic	Catskill	Catskill VA Clinic
Community Based Outpatient Clinic	Clifton Park	Clifton Park VA Clinic
Community Based Outpatient Clinic	Cortland	VA Outpatient Clinic
Community Based Outpatient Clinic	Dunkirk	Dunkirk VA Clinic
Community Based Outpatient Clinic	East Meadow	East Meadow VA Clinic
Community Based Outpatient Clinic	Elmira	Elmira VA Clinic
Community Based Outpatient Clinic	Fonda	Fonda VA Clinic
Community Based Outpatient Clinic	Freeville	Tompkins County VA Clinic
Community Based Outpatient Clinic	Glens Falls	Glens Falls VA Clinic
Community Based Outpatient Clinic	Goshen	Goshen VA Clinic
Community Based Outpatient Clinic	Jamestown	Jamestown VA Clinic
Community Based Outpatient Clinic	Kingston	Kingston VA Clinic
Community Based Outpatient Clinic	Lackawanna	Lackawanna VA Clinic
Community Based Outpatient Clinic	Lockport	Lockport VA Clinic
Community Based Outpatient Clinic	Massena	Massena VA Clinic
Community Based Outpatient Clinic	Monticello	Monticello VA Clinic
Community Based Outpatient Clinic	New York	Harlem VA Clinic
Community Based Outpatient Clinic	Niagara Falls	Niagara Falls VA Clinic
Community Based Outpatient Clinic	Olean	Olean VA Clinic
Community Based Outpatient Clinic	Oswego	Oswego VA Clinic
Community Based Outpatient Clinic	Patchogue	Patchogue VA Clinic
Community Based Outpatient Clinic	Pine Plains	Eastern Dutchess VA Clinic
Community Based Outpatient Clinic	Plattsburgh	Plattsburgh VA Clinic
Community Based Outpatient Clinic	Port Jervis	Port Jervis VA Clinic
Community Based Outpatient Clinic	Poughkeepsie	Poughkeepsie VA Clinic
Community Based Outpatient Clinic	Ridgewood	Thomas P. Noonan Jr. Department of Veterans Affairs Outpatient Clinic
Community Based Outpatient Clinic	Riverhead	Riverhead VA Clinic
Community Based Outpatient Clinic	Rochester	Rochester Westfall VA Clinic
Community Based Outpatient Clinic	Rome	Donald J. Mitchell Department of Veterans Affairs Outpatient Clinic
Community Based Outpatient Clinic	Saranac Lake	Saranac Lake VA Clinic
Community Based Outpatient Clinic	Schenectady	Schenectady VA Clinic
Community Based Outpatient Clinic	Staten Island	Staten Island Community VA Clinic
Community Based Outpatient Clinic	Springville	Springville VA Clinic
Community Based Outpatient Clinic	Troy	Troy VA Clinic
Community Based Outpatient Clinic	Valley Stream	Valley Stream VA Clinic
Community Based Outpatient Clinic	Watertown	Watertown VA Clinic
Community Based Outpatient Clinic	Watertown	Watertown 2 VA Clinic CANI
Community Based Outpatient Clinic	Wellsville	Wellsville VA Clinic
Community Based Outpatient Clinic	Westport	Westport VA Clinic
Community Based Outpatient Clinic	West Seneca	West Seneca VA Clinic
Community Based Outpatient Clinic	White Plains	White Plains VA Clinic
Community Based Outpatient Clinic	Yonkers	Yonkers VA Clinic

=== North Carolina ===
Service	City	Facility
VA Medical Center	Asheville	Charles George VA Medical Center
VA Medical Center	Durham	Durham VA Medical Center
VA Medical Center	Fayetteville	Fayetteville VA Medical Center
VA Medical Center	Salisbury	W.G. "Bill" Hefner VA Medical Center
Outpatient Clinic	Charlotte	South Charlotte VA Clinic
Outpatient Clinic	Fayetteville	Cumberland County VA Clinic
Outpatient Clinic	Greenville	Greenville VA Clinic
Outpatient Clinic	Kernersville	Kernersville VA Clinic
Outpatient Clinic	Raleigh	Blind Rehabilitation Outpatient Clinic (BROC)
Community Based Outpatient Clinic	Charlotte	North Charlotte VA Clinic
Community Based Outpatient Clinic	Durham	Hillandale Road VA Clinic
Community Based Outpatient Clinic	Elizabeth City	Albemarle VA Clinic
Community Based Outpatient Clinic	Fayetteville	Raeford Road VA Clinic
Community Based Outpatient Clinic	Fayetteville	Robeson Street VA Clinic
Community Based Outpatient Clinic	Franklin	Franklin VA Clinic
Community Based Outpatient Clinic	Garner	Garner VA Clinic
Community Based Outpatient Clinic	Goldsboro	Goldsboro VA Clinic
Community Based Outpatient Clinic	Goldsboro	Johnson Air Force Base VA Clinic
Community Based Outpatient Clinic	Hamlet	Hamlet VA Clinic
Community Based Outpatient Clinic	Havelock	Havelock VA Clinic
Community Based Outpatient Clinic	Hickory	Hickory VA Clinic
Community Based Outpatient Clinic	Jacksonville	Jacksonville VA Clinic
Community Based Outpatient Clinic	Morehead City	Morehead City VA Clinic
Community Based Outpatient Clinic	Pembroke	Robeson County VA Clinic
Community Based Outpatient Clinic	Raleigh	Brier Creek VA Clinic
Community Based Outpatient Clinic	Raleigh	Raleigh VA Clinic
Community Based Outpatient Clinic	Raleigh	Wake County VA Clinic
Community Based Outpatient Clinic	Raleigh	Raleigh III VA Clinic
Community Based Outpatient Clinic	Rutherfordton	Rutherford County VA Clinic
Community Based Outpatient Clinic	Sanford	Lee County VA Clinic
Community Based Outpatient Clinic	Supply	Brunswick County VA Clinic
Community Based Outpatient Clinic	Wilmington	Wilmington VA Clinic

=== North Dakota ===
Service	City	Facility
VA Medical Center	Fargo	Fargo VA Health Care System
Community Based Outpatient Clinic	Bismarck	Bismarck VA Clinic
Community Based Outpatient Clinic	Devils Lake	Devils Lake VA Clinic
Community Based Outpatient Clinic	Dickinson	Dickinson VA Clinic
Community Based Outpatient Clinic	Fargo	North Fargo VA Clinic
Community Based Outpatient Clinic	Grafton	Grafton VA Clinic
Community Based Outpatient Clinic	Grand Forks	Grand Forks VA Clinic
Community Based Outpatient Clinic	Jamestown	Jamestown VA Clinic
Community Based Outpatient Clinic	Minot	Minot VA Clinic
Community Based Outpatient Clinic	Williston	Williston VA Clinic

== O ==
=== Ohio ===
Service	City	Facility
VA Medical Center	Chillicothe	Chillicothe VA Medical Center
VA Medical Center	Cincinnati	Cincinnati VA Medical Center
VA Medical Center	Cleveland	Louis Stokes VA Medical Center
VA Medical Center	Dayton	Dayton VA Medical Center
Outpatient Clinic	Canton	Canton VA Clinic
Outpatient Clinic	Columbus	Chalmers P. Wylie Veterans Outpatient Clinic
Outpatient Clinic	Parma	Parma VA Clinic
Community Based Outpatient Clinic	Akron	Akron VA Clinic
Community Based Outpatient Clinic	Ashtabula	Ashtabula County VA Clinic
Community Based Outpatient Clinic	Calcutta	East Liverpool VA Clinic
Community Based Outpatient Clinic	Cambridge	Cambridge VA Clinic
Community Based Outpatient Clinic	Cincinnati	Clermont County VA Clinic
Community Based Outpatient Clinic	Cincinnati	Highland Avenue VA Clinic
Community Based Outpatient Clinic	Cincinnati	Vine Street VA Clinic
Community Based Outpatient Clinic	Cleveland	Cleveland VA Clinic-Euclid
Community Based Outpatient Clinic	Cleveland	McCafferty VA Clinic
Community Based Outpatient Clinic	Cleveland	Cleveland VA Clinic-Superior
Community Based Outpatient Clinic	Columbus	Columbus VA Clinic
Community Based Outpatient Clinic	Gallipolis	Gallipolis VA Clinic
Community Based Outpatient Clinic	Georgetown	Georgetown VA Clinic
Community Based Outpatient Clinic	Grove City	Grove City VA Clinic
Community Based Outpatient Clinic	Hamilton	Hamilton VA Clinic
Community Based Outpatient Clinic	Lancaster	Lancaster VA Clinic
Community Based Outpatient Clinic	Lima	Lima VA Clinic
Community Based Outpatient Clinic	Mansfield	David F. Winder CBOC
Community Based Outpatient Clinic	Marietta	Marietta VA Clinic
Community Based Outpatient Clinic	Marion	Marion VA Clinic
Community Based Outpatient Clinic	Middletown	Middletown VA Clinic
Community Based Outpatient Clinic	New Boston	Portsmouth VA Clinic
Community Based Outpatient Clinic	New Philadelphia	New Philadelphia VA Clinic
Community Based Outpatient Clinic	Newark	Daniel L. Kinnard VA Clinic
Community Based Outpatient Clinic	Norwood	Norwood VA Clinic
Community Based Outpatient Clinic	Painesville	Painesville Multi-Specialty Outpatient Clinic
Community Based Outpatient Clinic	Ravenna	Ravenna VA Clinic
Community Based Outpatient Clinic	Sandusky	Sandusky VA Clinic
Community Based Outpatient Clinic	Sheffield Village	Lorain VA Clinic
Community Based Outpatient Clinic	Springfield	Springfield VA Clinic
Community Based Outpatient Clinic	St. Clairsville	Belmont County VA Clinic
Community Based Outpatient Clinic	The Plains	Athens VA Clinic
Community Based Outpatient Clinic	Toledo	Toledo VA Clinic
Community Based Outpatient Clinic	Warren	Warren VA Clinic
Community Based Outpatient Clinic	Willoughby	Lake County VA Clinic
Community Based Outpatient Clinic	Wilmington	Wilmington VA Clinic
Community Based Outpatient Clinic	Wright Patterson AFB	Wright-Patterson VA Clinic
Community Based Outpatient Clinic	Youngstown	Carl Nunziato VA Clinic
Community Based Outpatient Clinic	Zanesville	Zanesville VA Clinic

=== Oklahoma ===
Service	City	Facility
VA Medical Center	Muskogee	Eastern Oklahoma VA Health Care System – Jack C. Montgomery VA Medical Center
VA Medical Center	Oklahoma City	Oklahoma City VA Medical Center
Outpatient Clinic	Tulsa	Ernest Childers Outpatient Clinic
Community Based Outpatient Clinic	Ada	Ada VA Clinic
Community Based Outpatient Clinic	Altus	Altus VA Clinic
Community Based Outpatient Clinic	Admore	Ardmore VA Clinic
Community Based Outpatient Clinic	Blackwell	Blackwell VA Clinic
Community Based Outpatient Clinic	Fort Sill	Lawton VA Clinic
Community Based Outpatient Clinic	Idabel	McCurtain County VA Clinic
Community Based Outpatient Clinic	Jay	Jay VA Clinic
Community Based Outpatient Clinic	Muskogee	Muskogee East VA Clinic
Community Based Outpatient Clinic	Oklahoma City	Fourteenth Street VA Clinic
Community Based Outpatient Clinic	Oklahoma City	North May VA Clinic
Community Based Outpatient Clinic	Tulsa	Tulsa Eleventh Street VA Clinic
Community Based Outpatient Clinic	Tulsa	Yale Avenue VA Clinic
Community Based Outpatient Clinic	Vinita	Vinita VA Clinic

=== Oregon ===
Service	City	Facility
VA Medical Center	Portland	VA Portland Health Care System – Portland VA Medical Center
VA Medical Center	Roseburg	VA Roseburg Healthcare System
VA Medical Center	White City	White City VA Medical Center
Outpatient Clinic	Eugene	Eugene VA Health Care Center
Community Based Outpatient Clinic	Astoria	Astoria VA Clinic
Community Based Outpatient Clinic	Bend	Robert D. Maxwell VA Clinic
Community Based Outpatient Clinic	Boardman	Morrow County VA Clinic
Community Based Outpatient Clinic	Brookings	Brookings VA Clinic
Community Based Outpatient Clinic	Enterprise	Wallowa County VA Clinic
Community Based Outpatient Clinic	Eugene	Downtown Eugene VA Clinic
Community Based Outpatient Clinic	Fairview	Fairview VA Clinic
Community Based Outpatient Clinic	Grants Pass	Grants Pass VA Clinic
Community Based Outpatient Clinic	Hines	Eastern Oregon VA Clinic
Community Based Outpatient Clinic	Hillsboro	Hillsboro VA Clinic
Community Based Outpatient Clinic	Klamath Falls	Klamath Falls VA Clinic
Community Based Outpatient Clinic	La Grande	La Grande VA Clinic
Community Based Outpatient Clinic	Lincoln City	Lincoln City Clinic
Community Based Outpatient Clinic	Newport	Newport VA Clinic
Community Based Outpatient Clinic	North Bend	North Bend VA Clinic
Community Based Outpatient Clinic	Portland	Portland VA Clinic
Community Based Outpatient Clinic	Salem	Salem VA Clinic
Community Based Outpatient Clinic	The Dalles	Loren R. Kaufman VA Clinic
Community Based Outpatient Clinic	Warrenton	North Coast VA Clinic
Community Based Outpatient Clinic	West Linn	West Linn VA Clinic

== P ==
=== Pennsylvania ===
Service	City	Facility
VA Medical Center	Altoona	James E. Van Zandt VA Medical Center
VA Medical Center	Butler	VA Butler Healthcare
VA Medical Center	Coatesville	Coatesville VA Medical Center
VA Medical Center	Erie	Erie VA Medical Center
VA Medical Center	Lebanon	Lebanon VA Medical Center
VA Medical Center	Philadelphia	Corporal Michael J. Crescenz VA Medical Center
VA Medical Center	Pittsburgh	H. John Heinz III Department of Veterans Affairs Medical Center
VA Medical Center	Pittsburgh	Pittsburgh VA Medical Center-University Drive
VA Medical Center	Wilkes-Barre	Wilkes-Barre VA Medical Center
Community Service Programs	Philadelphia	Philadelphia MultiService Center
Community Based Outpatient Clinic	Allentown	Allentown VA Clinic
Community Based Outpatient Clinic	Bangor	Northampton County VA Clinic
Community Based Outpatient Clinic	Berwick	Columbia County VA Clinic
Community Based Outpatient Clinic	Bradford	McKean County VA Clinic
Community Based Outpatient Clinic	Butler	Abie Abraham VA Clinic
Community Based Outpatient Clinic	Coudersport	Coudersport VA Clinic
Community Based Outpatient Clinic	Cranberry Township	Cranberry Township VA Clinic
Community Based Outpatient Clinic	DuBois	DuBois VA Clinic
Community Based Outpatient Clinic	Franklin	Venango County VA Clinic
Community Based Outpatient Clinic	Hermitage	Michael A. Marzano Department of Veterans Affairs Outpatient Clinic
Community Based Outpatient Clinic	Honesdale	Wayne County VA Clinic
Community Based Outpatient Clinic	Horsham	Victor J. Saracini Department of Veterans Affairs Outpatient Clinic
Community Based Outpatient Clinic	Indiana	Indiana County VA Clinic
Community Based Outpatient Clinic	Johnstown	Johnstown VA Clinic
Community Based Outpatient Clinic	Kittanning	Armstrong County VA Clinic
Community Based Outpatient Clinic	Meadville	Crawford County VA Clinic
Community Based Outpatient Clinic	Mapleton Depot	Huntingdon County VA Clinic
Community Based Outpatient Clinic	Mechanicsburg	Cumberland County VA Clinic
Community Based Outpatient Clinic	New Castle	Lawrence County VA Clinic
Community Based Outpatient Clinic	Newtown Square	Delaware County VA Clinic
Community Based Outpatient Clinic	Monroe Township	Clarion County VA Clinic
Community Based Outpatient Clinic	Philadelphia	Chestnut Street VA Clinic
Community Based Outpatient Clinic	Philadelphia	Fourth Street VA Clinic
Community Based Outpatient Clinic	Philadelphia	West Philadelphia VA Clinic
Community Based Outpatient Clinic	Pottsville	Schuylkill County VA Clinic
Community Based Outpatient Clinic	Rochester	Beaver County VA Clinic
Community Based Outpatient Clinic	Sayre	Sayre VA Clinic
Community Based Outpatient Clinic	Spring City	Spring City VA Clinic
Community Based Outpatient Clinic	State College	State College VA Clinic
Community Based Outpatient Clinic	Tobyhanna Army Depot	Tobyhanna VA Clinic
Community Based Outpatient Clinic	Uniontown	Fayette County VA Clinic
Community Based Outpatient Clinic	Warren	Warren County VA Clinic
Community Based Outpatient Clinic	Washington	Washington County VA Clinic
Community Based Outpatient Clinic	Williamsport	Williamsport VA Clinic
Community Based Outpatient Clinic	Willow Street	Lancaster County VA Clinic
Community Based Outpatient Clinic	Wyomissing	Berks County VA Clinic
Community Based Outpatient Clinic	York	York VA Clinic

=== Puerto Rico ===
Service	City	Facility
VA Medical Center	San Juan	San Juan VA Medical Center
Outpatient Clinic	Mayagüez	Mayagüez VA Clinic
Outpatient Clinic	Ponce	Eurípides Rubio Ponce VA Outpatient Clinic
Community Based Outpatient Clinic	Arecibo	Arecibo VA Clinic
Community Based Outpatient Clinic	Ceiba	Ceiba VA Clinic
Community Based Outpatient Clinic	Comerío	Comerío VA Clinic
Community Based Outpatient Clinic	Guayama	Guayama VA Clinic
Community Based Outpatient Clinic	Hato Rey	Hato Rey VA Clinic
Community Based Outpatient Clinic	Utuado	Utuado VA Clinic
Community Based Outpatient Clinic	Vieques	Vieques VA Clinic

== R ==
=== Rhode Island ===
Service	City	Facility
VA Medical Center	Providence	Providence VA Medical Center
Community Based Outpatient Clinic	Middletown	Middletown VA Clinic

== S ==
=== South Carolina ===
Service	City	Facility
VA Medical Center	Charleston	Ralph H. Johnson VA Medical Center
VA Medical Center	Columbia	Columbia VA Health Care System – Wm. Jennings Bryan Dorn VA Medical Center
Outpatient Clinic	Greenville	Lance Corporal Dana Cornell Darnell VA Clinic
Community Based Outpatient Clinic	Aiken	Aiken VA Clinic
Community Based Outpatient Clinic	Anderson	Anderson VA Clinic
Community Based Outpatient Clinic	Florence	Florence VA Clinic
Community Based Outpatient Clinic	Joint Base Charleston	Goose Creek VA Clinic
Community Based Outpatient Clinic	Mount Pleasant	Mount Pleasant VA Clinic
Community Based Outpatient Clinic	Myrtle Beach	Market Commons VA Clinic
Community Based Outpatient Clinic	Myrtle Beach	Myrtle Beach VA Clinic
Community Based Outpatient Clinic	Naval Hospital Beaufort	Beaufort VA Clinic
Community Based Outpatient Clinic	North Charleston	North Charleston VA Clinic
Community Based Outpatient Clinic	Orangeburg	Orangeburg VA Clinic
Community Based Outpatient Clinic	Rock Hill	Rock Hill VA Clinic
Community Based Outpatient Clinic	Spartanburg	Spartanburg VA Clinic
Community Based Outpatient Clinic	Sumter	Sumter VA Clinic

=== South Dakota ===
Service	City	Facility
VA Medical Center	Fort Meade	VA Black Hills Health Care System – Fort Meade Campus
VA Medical Center	Hot Springs	VA Black Hills Health Care System – Hot Springs Campus
VA Medical Center	Sioux Falls	Sioux Falls VA Health Care System – Royal C. Johnson Veterans Memorial Hospital
Community Based Outpatient Clinic	Aberdeen	Aberdeen VA Clinic
Community Based Outpatient Clinic	Dakota Dunes	Sioux City VA Clinic
Community Based Outpatient Clinic	Mission	Mission VA Clinic
Community Based Outpatient Clinic	Pierre	Pierre VA Clinic
Community Based Outpatient Clinic	Pine Ridge	Pine Ridge VA Clinic
Community Based Outpatient Clinic	Rapid City	Rapid City VA Clinic
Community Based Outpatient Clinic	Wagner	Wagner VA Clinic
Community Based Outpatient Clinic	Watertown	Watertown VA Clinic
Community Based Outpatient Clinic	Winner	Winner VA Clinic

== T ==
=== Tennessee ===
Service	City	Facility
VA Medical Center	Memphis	Lt. Col. Luke Weathers, Jr. Memphis VA Medical Center
VA Medical Center	Mountain Home	Mountain Home VA Healthcare System – James H. Quillen VA Medical Center
VA Medical Center	Murfreesboro	Alvin C. York Veterans' Administration Medical Center
VA Medical Center	Nashville	Nashville VA Medical Center
Outpatient Clinic	Knoxville	William C. Tallent Department of Veterans Affairs Outpatient Clinic
Community Based Outpatient Clinic	Arnold AFB	Tullahoma VA Clinic
Community Based Outpatient Clinic	Athens	Athens VA Clinic
Community Based Outpatient Clinic	Chattanooga	Chattanooga VA Clinic
Community Based Outpatient Clinic	Clarksville	Clarksville VA Clinic
Community Based Outpatient Clinic	Clarksville	Dalton Drive VA Clinic
Community Based Outpatient Clinic	Columbia	Maury County VA Clinic
Community Based Outpatient Clinic	Cookeville	Cookeville VA Clinic
Community Based Outpatient Clinic	Dover	Dover VA Clinic
Community Based Outpatient Clinic	Dyersburg	Dyersburg VA Clinic
Community Based Outpatient Clinic	Gallatin	Gallatin VA Clinic
Community Based Outpatient Clinic	Harriman	Roane County VA Clinic
Community Based Outpatient Clinic	Jackson	Jackson VA Clinic
Community Based Outpatient Clinic	LaFollette	Campbell County VA Clinic
Community Based Outpatient Clinic	Memphis	Covington VA Clinic
Community Based Outpatient Clinic	Memphis	Nonconnah Boulevard VA Clinic
Community Based Outpatient Clinic	Memphis	Union Avenue VA Clinic
Community Based Outpatient Clinic	McMinnville	McMinnville VA Clinic
Community Based Outpatient Clinic	Morristown	Morristown VA Clinic
Community Based Outpatient Clinic	Murfreesboro	Glenis Drive VA Clinic
Community Based Outpatient Clinic	Murfreesboro	Glenis Drive 2 VA Clinic
Community Based Outpatient Clinic	Murfreesboro	Heritage Park Drive VA Clinic
Community Based Outpatient Clinic	Nashville	Albion Street VA Clinic
Community Based Outpatient Clinic	Nashville	Charlotte Avenue VA Clinic
Community Based Outpatient Clinic	Nashville	International Plaza VA Clinic
Community Based Outpatient Clinic	Rogersville	Rogersville VA Clinic
Community Based Outpatient Clinic	Savannah	Savannah VA Clinic
Community Based Outpatient Clinic	Sevierville	Dannie A. Carr Veterans Outpatient Clinic

=== Texas ===
Service	City	Facility
VA Medical Center	Amarillo	Amarillo VA Health Care System – Thomas E. Creek VA Medical Center
VA Medical Center	Big Spring	West Texas VA Health Care System – George H. O'Brien Department of Veterans Affairs Medical Center
VA Medical Center	Dallas	Dallas VA Medical Center
VA Medical Center	Houston	Michael E. DeBakey Veterans Affairs Medical Center
VA Medical Center	Kerrville	Kerrville VA Medical Center
VA Medical Center	San Antonio	Audie L. Murphy Memorial VA Hospital
VA Medical Center	Temple	Central Texas Veterans Health Care System – Olin E. Teague Veterans' Center
VA Medical Center	Waco	Doris Miller Department of Veterans Affairs Medical Center
Outpatient Clinic	Austin	Austin VA Clinic
Outpatient Clinic	Corpus Christi	Corpus Christi West Point VA Clinic
Outpatient Clinic	El Paso	El Paso VA Clinic
Outpatient Clinic	Fort Worth	Fort Worth VA Clinic
Outpatient Clinic	Harlingen	Harlingen VA Clinic
Outpatient Clinic	Laredo	Laredo VA Clinic
Outpatient Clinic	Lubbock	Lubbock VA Clinic
Outpatient Clinic	McAllen	McAllen VA Clinic
Outpatient Clinic	San Antonio	Frank M. Tejeda VA Outpatient Clinic
Outpatient Clinic	San Antonio	North Central Federal VA Clinic
Outpatient Clinic	Tomball	Tomball VA Clinic
Community Based Outpatient Clinic	Abilene	Abilene VA Clinic
Community Based Outpatient Clinic	Beaumont	Beaumont VA Clinic
Community Based Outpatient Clinic	Beeville	Beeville VA Clinic
Community Based Outpatient Clinic	Bonham	Sam Rayburn Memorial Veterans Center
Community Based Outpatient Clinic	Brownsville	Brownsville VA Clinic
Community Based Outpatient Clinic	Brownwood	Brownwood VA Clinic
Community Based Outpatient Clinic	Cedar Park	Cedar Park VA Clinic
Community Based Outpatient Clinic	Childress	Childress VA Clinic
Community Based Outpatient Clinic	College Station	Bryan VA Clinic
Community Based Outpatient Clinic	Conroe	Conroe VA Clinic
Community Based Outpatient Clinic	Corpus Christi	Corpus Christi VA Clinic
Community Based Outpatient Clinic	Corpus Christi	South Enterprize VA Clinic
Community Based Outpatient Clinic	Dalhart	Dalhart VA Clinic
Community Based Outpatient Clinic	Dallas	Dallas VA Clinic
Community Based Outpatient Clinic	Dallas	Polk Street VA Clinic
Community Based Outpatient Clinic	Decatur	Decatur VA Clinic
Community Based Outpatient Clinic	Denton	Denton VA Clinic
Community Based Outpatient Clinic	El Paso	El Paso Central VA Clinic
Community Based Outpatient Clinic	El Paso	El Paso Eastside VA Clinic
Community Based Outpatient Clinic	El Paso	El Paso Northeast VA Clinic
Community Based Outpatient Clinic	El Paso	El Paso South Central VA Clinic
Community Based Outpatient Clinic	El Paso	El Paso Westside VA Clinic
Community Based Outpatient Clinic	Fort Stockton	Fort Stockton VA Clinic
Community Based Outpatient Clinic	Galveston	Galveston County VA Clinic
Community Based Outpatient Clinic	Granbury	Granbury VA Clinic
Community Based Outpatient Clinic	Grand Prairie	Grand Prairie VA Clinic
Community Based Outpatient Clinic	Greenville	Greenville VA Clinic
Community Based Outpatient Clinic	Harlingen	Harlingen VA Clinic-Treasure Hills
Community Based Outpatient Clinic	Houston	Houston Webster VA Clinic
Community Based Outpatient Clinic	Katy	Katy VA Clinic
Community Based Outpatient Clinic	LaGrange	LaGrange VA Clinic
Community Based Outpatient Clinic	Lake Jackson	Lake Jackson VA Clinic
Community Based Outpatient Clinic	Longview	Longview VA Clinic
Community Based Outpatient Clinic	Lufkin	Charlie Wilson VA Outpatient Clinic
Community Based Outpatient Clinic	New Braunfels	New Braunfels VA Clinic
Community Based Outpatient Clinic	Odessa	Wilson and Young Medal of Honor VA Clinic
Community Based Outpatient Clinic	Palestine	Palestine VA Clinic
Community Based Outpatient Clinic	Plano	Plano VA Clinic
Community Based Outpatient Clinic	Richmond	Richmond VA Clinic
Community Based Outpatient Clinic	San Angelo	San Angelo VA Clinic
Community Based Outpatient Clinic	San Antonio	Balcones Heights VA Clinic
Community Based Outpatient Clinic	San Antonio	Data Point VA Clinic
Community Based Outpatient Clinic	San Antonio	North Bexar County VA Clinic
Community Based Outpatient Clinic	San Antonio	San Antonio VA Clinic
Community Based Outpatient Clinic	San Antonio	San Antonio-Pecan Valley VA Clinic
Community Based Outpatient Clinic	San Antonio	Southwest VA Clinic
Community Based Outpatient Clinic	San Antonio	South Bexar County VA Clinic
Community Based Outpatient Clinic	San Antonio	Shavano Park VA Clinic
Community Based Outpatient Clinic	San Antonio	Walzem VA Clinic
Community Based Outpatient Clinic	Seguin	Seguin VA Clinic
Community Based Outpatient Clinic	Sheppard Air Force Base	Wichita Falls VA Clinic
Community Based Outpatient Clinic	Sherman	Sherman VA Clinic
Community Based Outpatient Clinic	Sugar Land	Sugar Land VA Clinic
Community Based Outpatient Clinic	Stratford	Stamford VA Clinic
Community Based Outpatient Clinic	Temple	Temple VA Clinic
Community Based Outpatient Clinic	Texas City	Texas City VA Clinic
Community Based Outpatient Clinic	Tyler	Tyler Broadway VA Clinic
Community Based Outpatient Clinic	Tyler	Tyler Centennial VA Clinic
Community Based Outpatient Clinic	Victoria	Victoria VA Clinic

== U ==
=== Utah ===
Service	City	Facility
VA Medical Center	Salt Lake City	George E. Wahlen VA Medical Center
Community Based Outpatient Clinic	Orem	Orem VA Clinic
Community Based Outpatient Clinic	Price	Price VA Clinic
Community Based Outpatient Clinic	Roosevelt	Roosevelt VA Clinic
Community Based Outpatient Clinic	South Ogden	Ogden VA Clinic
Community Based Outpatient Clinic	South Ogden	Weber County VA Clinic
Community Based Outpatient Clinic	St. George	St. George VA Clinic
Community Based Outpatient Clinic	West Valley City	Western Salt Lake VA Clinic

== V ==
=== Vermont ===
Service	City	Facility
VA Medical Center	White River Junction	White River Junction VA Medical Center
Community Based Outpatient Clinic	Bennington	Bennington CBOC
Community Based Outpatient Clinic	Brattleboro	Brattleboro CBOC
Community Based Outpatient Clinic	Burlington	Burlington Lakeside CBOC
Community Based Outpatient Clinic	Newport	Newport CBOC
Community Based Outpatient Clinic	Rutland	Rutland CBOC

=== Virginia ===
Service	City	Facility
VA Medical Center	Hampton	Hampton VA Medical Center
VA Medical Center	Richmond	Hunter Holmes McGuire VA Medical Center
VA Medical Center	Salem	Salem VA Medical Center
Community Based Outpatient Clinic	Bristol	Bristol VA Clinic
Community Based Outpatient Clinic	Charlottesville	Charlottesville VA Clinic
Community Based Outpatient Clinic	Chesapeake	Chesapeake VA Clinic
Community Based Outpatient Clinic	Chesapeake	North Battlefield VA Clinic
Community Based Outpatient Clinic	Danville	Danville VA Clinic
Community Based Outpatient Clinic	Emporia	Emporia VA Clinic
Community Based Outpatient Clinic	Fort Belvoir	Fort Belvoir VA Clinic
Community Based Outpatient Clinic	Fredericksburg	Fredericksburg VA Clinic
Community Based Outpatient Clinic	Fredericksburg	Fredericksburg 2 VA Clinic Southpoint
Community Based Outpatient Clinic	Harrisonburg	Harrisonburg VA Clinic
Community Based Outpatient Clinic	Jonesville	Jonesville VA Clinic
Community Based Outpatient Clinic	Lynchburg	Lynchburg VA Clinic
Community Based Outpatient Clinic	Marion	Marion VA Clinic
Community Based Outpatient Clinic	Norton	Norton VA Clinic
Community Based Outpatient Clinic	Staunton	Staunton VA Clinic
Community Based Outpatient Clinic	Tazewell	Tazewell VA Clinic
Community Based Outpatient Clinic	Vansant	Vansant VA Clinic
Community Based Outpatient Clinic	Virginia Beach	Virginia Beach VA Clinic
Community Based Outpatient Clinic	Winchester	Stephens City VA Clinic
Community Based Outpatient Clinic	Wytheville	Wytheville VA Clinic

=== Virgin Islands ===
Service	City	Facility
Community Based Outpatient Clinic	Kings Hill	Saint Croix VA Clinic
Community Based Outpatient Clinic	Saint Thomas	Saint Thomas VA Clinic

== W ==
=== Washington ===
Service	City	Facility
VA Medical Center	Seattle	Seattle VA Medical Center
VA Medical Center	Spokane	Mann-Grandstaff VA Medical Center
VA Medical Center	Tacoma	American Lake VA Medical Center
VA Medical Center	Vancouver	Vancouver VA Medical Center
VA Medical Center	Walla Walla	Jonathan M. Wainwright Memorial VA Medical Center
Community Based Outpatient Clinic	Bellevue	Bellevue VA Clinic
Community Based Outpatient Clinic	Chehalis	South Sound VA Clinic
Community Based Outpatient Clinic	Colville	Colville Rural Health Clinic
Community Based Outpatient Clinic	Edmonds	Edmonds VA Clinic
Community Based Outpatient Clinic	Everett	Everett VA Clinic
Community Based Outpatient Clinic	Federal Way	Federal Way VA Clinic
Community Based Outpatient Clinic	Mount Vernon	Mount Vernon VA Clinic
Community Based Outpatient Clinic	Olympia	Olympia VA Clinic
Community Based Outpatient Clinic	Port Angeles	North Olympic Peninsula VA Clinic
Community Based Outpatient Clinic	Puyallup	Puyallup VA Clinic
Community Based Outpatient Clinic	Renton	Renton VA Clinic
Community Based Outpatient Clinic	Republic	Republic Rural Health Clinic
Community Based Outpatient Clinic	Richland	Richland VA Clinic
Community Based Outpatient Clinic	Seattle	South Lucile Street VA Clinic
Community Based Outpatient Clinic	Silverdale	Silverdale VA Clinic
Community Based Outpatient Clinic	Union Gap	Yakima VA Clinic
Community Based Outpatient Clinic	Tacoma	Puget Sound VA Mobile Clinic
Community Based Outpatient Clinic	Wenatchee	Wenatchee VA Clinic

=== West Virginia ===
Service	City	Facility
VA Medical Center	Beckley	Beckley VA Medical Center
VA Medical Center	Clarksburg	Louis A. Johnson VA Medical Center
VA Medical Center	Huntington	Hershel "Woody" Williams VA Medical Center
VA Medical Center	Martinsburg	Martinsburg VA Medical Center
Domiciliary	Huntington	Huntington Ninth Street VA Clinic
Community Based Outpatient Clinic	Clarksburg	Rural Mobile Unit
Community Based Outpatient Clinic	Franklin	Franklin VA Clinic
Community Based Outpatient Clinic	Gassaway	Braxton County VA Clinic
Community Based Outpatient Clinic	Lenore	Lenore VA Clinic
Community Based Outpatient Clinic	Lewisburg	Greenbrier County VA Clinic
Community Based Outpatient Clinic	Parkersburg	Wood County VA Clinic
Community Based Outpatient Clinic	Parsons	Tucker County VA Clinic
Community Based Outpatient Clinic	Petersburg	Petersburg VA Clinic
Community Based Outpatient Clinic	Princeton	Princeton VA Clinic
Community Based Outpatient Clinic	Ronceverte	Greenbrier County VA Clinic
Community Based Outpatient Clinic	South Charleston	Charleston VA Clinic
Community Based Outpatient Clinic	Westover	Monongalia County CBOC

=== Wisconsin ===
Service	City	Facility
VA Medical Center	Madison	William S. Middleton Memorial Veterans Hospital
VA Medical Center	Milwaukee	Clement J. Zablocki VA Medical Center
VA Medical Center	Tomah	Tomah VA Medical Center
Outpatient Clinic	Green Bay	Milo C. Huempfner Outpatient Clinic
Community Based Outpatient Clinic	Appleton	John H. Bradley Department of Veterans Affairs Outpatient Clinic
Community Based Outpatient Clinic	Baraboo	Baraboo VA Clinic
Community Based Outpatient Clinic	Beaver Dam	Beaver Dam VA Clinic
Community Based Outpatient Clinic	Chippewa Falls	Chippewa Valley VA Clinic
Community Based Outpatient Clinic	Cleveland	Cleveland VA Clinic
Community Based Outpatient Clinic	Janesville	Janesville VA Clinic
Community Based Outpatient Clinic	Kenosha	Kenosha VA Clinic
Community Based Outpatient Clinic	La Crosse	River Valley VA Clinic
Community Based Outpatient Clinic	Madison	Madison East Clinic
Community Based Outpatient Clinic	Madison	Madison Central Clinic
Community Based Outpatient Clinic	Madison	Madison West VA Clinic
Community Based Outpatient Clinic	Owen	Clark County VA Clinic
Community Based Outpatient Clinic	Rice Lake	Rice Lake VA Clinic
Community Based Outpatient Clinic	Rhinelander	Rhinelander VA Clinic
Community Based Outpatient Clinic	Superior	Twin Ports VA Clinic
Community Based Outpatient Clinic	Union Grove	Union Grove VA Clinic
Community Based Outpatient Clinic	Wausau	Wausau VA Clinic
Wisconsin Rapids	Wisconsin Rapids VA Clinic	

=== Wyoming ===
Service	City	Facility
VA Medical Center	Cheyenne	Cheyenne VA Medical Center
VA Medical Center	Sheridan	Sheridan VA Medical Center
Community Based Outpatient Clinic	Afton	Afton VA Clinic
Community Based Outpatient Clinic	Casper	Casper VA Clinic
Community Based Outpatient Clinic	Cody	Cody VA Clinic
Community Based Outpatient Clinic	Evanston	Evanston VA Clinic
Community Based Outpatient Clinic	Gillette	Gillette VA Clinic
Community Based Outpatient Clinic	Laramie	Laramie VA Mobile Clinic
Community Based Outpatient Clinic	Newcastle	Newcastle VA Clinic
Community Based Outpatient Clinic	Rawlins	Rawlins VA Clinic
Community Based Outpatient Clinic	Riverton	Riverton VA Clinic
Community Based Outpatient Clinic	Rock Springs	Rock Springs VA Clinic
Community Based Outpatient Clinic	Torrington	Torrington VA Mobile Clinic
Community Based Outpatient Clinic	Wheatland	Wheatland VA Mobile Clinic
Community Based Outpatient Clinic	Worland	Worland VA Clinic
