= Commission on Accreditation of Rehabilitation Facilities =

International non-profit organization

The Commission on Accreditation of Rehabilitation Facilities (CARF) is an international, non-profit organization founded in 1966 with the assistance of Mary E. Switzer, then U.S. Social and Rehabilitation Services commissioner. For some institutions, it represents an alternative to Joint Commission certification. Revenue sources include contributions from the International Advisory Council, which comprises entities being accredited.

CARF's mission is to provide accreditation standards and surveyors for organizations working in the human-services field worldwide with a base in traditional facilities and institutional settings. Among the many areas of practice represented in the CARF standards are aging services; behavioral health, which replaces institutional behavior management; psychosocial rehabilitation; child and youth services (with younger and established family services and support); durable medical equipment, prosthetics, orthotics, and supplies (DMEPOS); employment (e.g., work readiness and evaluation) and community services; medical (and "community") rehabilitation; and opioid treatment programs. The standards, policies, and accreditation process are actively overseen by an elected board of 11 directors.

CARF International is based in Tucson, Arizona, in the United States, with offices in Washington, D.C., and Edmonton, Alberta, Canada. It is considered a system of rehabilitation facilities (now growing larger and associated with private criminal justice facilities) that monitor and accredit themselves, in order to maintain standards and state certifications. Brian J. Boon is president/CEO.

== Controversies ==
In 2012, Narconon Arrowhead was under investigation by the Oklahoma State Bureau of Investigation, the Pittsburg County Sheriff's Office, the Oklahoma State Department of Mental Health and Substance Abuse, for the four deaths related to the facility since 2009. Narconon is recognized by the state because of CARF accreditation since 1992.

== See also ==
- International healthcare accreditation
